This is a list of encyclopedias and encyclopedic/biographical dictionaries published on the subject of history and historians in any language. Entries are in the English language except where noted.

General history
American Association for State and Local History. Directory of historical organizations in the United States and Canada. AASLH Press, 1990–. .
Bagnall, Roger S.; Brodersen, Kai; Champion, Craige B.; Erskine, Andrew, Huebner, Sabine R. (2012): The Encyclopedia of Ancient History, Wiley, 13 vols, 7,800 pages. . Subscription-based online access available.
Behnen, Michael, ed. (2002): Lexikon der deutschen Geschichte 1945–1990. Ereignisse – Institutionen – Personen im geteilten Deutschland. Kröner, Stuttgart 2002, . 
Burnett, Thom.  Conspiracy Encyclopedia: The Encyclopedia of Conspiracy Theories
Carruth, Gordon. Encyclopedia of World Facts and Dates. HarperCollins, 1993. 
DeFronzo, James V. Revolutionary movements in world history: From 1750 to the present. ABC-CLIO, 2006. .
dtv (2002): Lexikon des Mittelalters, Deutscher Taschenbuch Verlag, 9 vols, paperback, 9,900 pages. . Online edition (2009) available from Brepolis, .  
Evans, Barbara Jean. A to zax: a comprehensive dictionary for genealogists & historians. Hearthside Press, 1995. .
Feather, John. Dictionary of Book History. Oxford University Press, 1987.  
Fondation DHS, ed. (2011) Dictionnaire Historique de la Suisse (Historical Dictionary of Switzerland), Editions Gilles Attinger, Hauterive, .  Also published in German as Historisches Lexikon der Schweiz, Schwabe AG, Basel,   and Italian as Dizionario storico della Svizzera, Armando Dadò editore, Locarno, . . The work currently consists of 10 volumes (A-Sa) in each language and is expected to be completed in 2014 with the 13th volume. Free searchable online access is available.
Geiss, Dieter, contrib. (2008): Der Grosse Ploetz, 35th edition, Verlag Vandenhoeck & Ruprecht, 2,128 pages. .  
Haydn, Joseph, Benjamin Vincent. Haydn's dictionary of dates and universal information relating to all ages and nations. Scholarly Press, 1968.
International Committee of Historical Sciences. International bibliography of historical sciences: Internationale Bibliographie der Geschichtswissenschaften. Librairie Armand Colin. .
Johnson, David E. From day to day: A calendar of notable birthdays and events. Scarecrow Press, 2001. .

Kohn, George Childs, Leonard Latkovski, Jr. Dictionary of historic documents. Facts on File, 2003. .
Kuhlman, Erika A. A to Z of women in world history. Facts on File, 2002. .
Langer, William L. An Encyclopedia of World History: Ancient, Medieval, and Modern, Chronologically Arranged. 5th ed., Houghton Mifflin, 1972. 
Lenman, Bruce, Hilary Marsden. Chambers dictionary of world history. Chambers, 2005. .
MacCusker, John J. History of world trade since 1450. Macmillan Reference USA, 2006. .
Peregrine, Peter N., Melvin Ember, Human Relations Area Files, Inc. Encyclopedia of prehistory. Kluwer Academic/Plenum, 2001–2002. .
Ritter, Harry. Dictionary of concepts in history. Greenwood Press, 1986. .
Shillington, Kevin (2004). Encyclopedia of African History. Routledge. 3 vols. 1,912 pages. .
Stearns, Peter N. (2001): The Encyclopedia of World History, 6th edition, Houghton Mifflin Harcourt, 1,243 pages. With searchable CD. .
Strayer, Joseph, ed. (1989). Dictionary of the Middle Ages. Charles Scribner's Sons. . Jordan, William Chester, ed. (2003). Dictionary of the Middle Ages: Supplement 1. Charles Scribner's Sons.   
Taddey, Gerhard, ed. (1998): Lexikon der deutschen Geschichte. Ereignisse, Institutionen, Personen. Von den Anfängen bis zur Kapitulation 1945., 3rd edition, Kröner, Stuttgart, 1,410 pages. .
Wetterau, Bruce. Macmillan Concise Dictionary of World History. Macmillan, 1983. 
Williams, Henry Smith (1905), The Historians' History of the World, New York, The Outlook Company.

Chronologies
Asimov's Chronology of the World. HarperCollins, 1991.
Grun, Bernard. Timetables of History. 3rd ed, Simon & Schuster, 1991.
Murray, Tim. Milestones in archaeology: A chronological encyclopedia. ABC-CLIO, 2007. .
New York Public Library Book of Chronologies. Prentice Hall, 1990.
Trager, James. The People's Chronology: A Year-by-Year Record of Human Events from Prehistory to the Present. Rev. ed., Holt, 1992.

Exploration and discovery
Bohlander, Richard. World Explorers and Discoverers. Macmillan, 1992. 
Delpar, Helen. The Discoverers: An Encyclopedia of Explorers and Exploration. McGraw-Hill, 1980. 
Holland, Clive. Arctic exploration and development, c. 500 B.C. to 1915: An encyclopedia. Garland Publ., 1994. .
The Marshall Cavendish Illustrated Encyclopedia of Discovery and Exploration. Marshall Cavendish, 1991.

Historians
Boyd, Kelly. Encyclopedia of historians and historical writing. Fitzroy Dearborn, 1999. .
Cannon, John Ashton. The Blackwell dictionary of historians. Blackwell Reference, 1988. .
Jenkins, Ellen J. Eighteenth-Century British Historians. Thomson Gale, 2007. .
Wilson, Clyde Norman. American historians, 1607–1865. Gale Research, 1984. .

Historiography
Boia, Lucian, Ellen Nore, Keith Hitchins International Committee of Historical Sciences. Great historians from antiquity to 1800: An international dictionary. Greenwood Press, 1989. .
Woolf, D. R., Kathryn M. Brammall, Greg Bak. A global encyclopedia of historical writing. Garland, 1998. .

History by era

Ancient history
Bhattacharyya, Narendra Nath. The Geographical dictionary: Ancient and early medieval India. Munshiram Manoharlal Publishers, 1991. .
Leroi-Gourham, André, José Garanger, Dominique Baffier. Dictionnaire de la préhistoire. Presses universitaires de France, 1988. . (French) 
Salisbury, Joyce E., Mary Lefkowitz. Encyclopedia of women in the ancient world. ABC-CLIO, 2001. .

Classical era

Avi-Yonah, Michael, Israel Shatzman, F. W. Walbank.Illustrated encyclopaedia of the classical world. Sampson Low, 1976. .
Cancik, Hubert, Helmuth Schneider, Christine F. Salazar, David E. Orton. Brill's New Pauly: Encyclopaedia of the ancient world. Brill, 2002–. .
Daremberg, Charles Victor. Dictionnaire des antiquités grecques et romaines, d'après les textes et les monuments. Hachette, 1877–1919. (French).
De Grummond, Nancy Thomson. An encyclopedia of the history of classical archaeology. Greenwood Press, 1996. .
Grant, Michael, Rachel Kitzinger. Civilization of the ancient Mediterranean: Greece and Rome. Scribner's, 1988. .
Hazel, John. Who's who in the Greek world. Routledge, 2000. .
Hazel, John. Who's who in the Roman world. Routledge. .
Hornblower, Simon, Antony Spawforth. The Oxford classical dictionary. Oxford University Press, 2003. .
Hornblower, Simon, Antony Spawforth. The Oxford companion to classical civilization. Oxford University Press, 1998. .
Pauly, August Friedrich von. Paulys real-encyclopadie der classischen Altertumswissenschaft. Supplement: Neue Bearbeitung unter Mitwirkung zahlreicher Fachgenossen. J. B. Metzler, 1903–1978.
Paulys real-encyclopadie der classischen Altertumswissenschaft: neue Bearbeitung unter Mitwirkung zahlreicher Fachgenossen. J.B. Metzler, 1894–1972. (German)
Salisbury, Joyce E., Mary Lefkowitz. Encyclopedia of women in the ancient world. ABC-CLIO, 2001. .
Shipley, Graham. The Cambridge dictionary of classical civilization. Cambridge University Press, 2006. .
Speake, Graham. Encyclopedia of Greece and the Hellenic tradition. Fitzroy Dearborn, 2000.

Middle Ages
Bhattacharyya, Narendra Nath. The Geographical dictionary: Ancient and early medieval India. Munshiram Manoharlal Publishers, 1991. .
Broughton, Bradford B., Megan Broughton Blumbergs. Dictionary of medieval knighthood and chivalry. Greenwood Press, 1986. .
Chevalier, Ulysse. Répertoire des sources historiques du moyen âge. A. Picard, 1905–1907.
Crabtree, Pam J. Medieval archaeology: An encyclopedia. Garland, 2001. .
Dahmus, Joseph. Dictionary of Medieval Civilization. Macmillan, 1984.
Fritze, Ronald H., William B. Robison. Historical dictionary of late medieval England, 1272–1485. Greenwood Press, c2002. .
Gerli, E. Michael, Samuel G. Armistead. Medieval Iberia: An encyclopedia. Routledge, 2003. .
International encyclopaedia for the Middle Ages (IEMA): A supplement to LexMA-online. Brepols. Available online here.
Jeep, John M. Medieval Germany: An encyclopedia. Garland, 2001. .
Johnson, Ruth A. All things medieval: an encyclopedia of the medieval world. Greenwood, 2011. .
Jordan, William C. Dictionary of the Middle Ages. Charles Scribner's Sons, 2004–. .
Kazhdan, Alexander B. The Oxford Dictionary of Byzantium. Oxford University Press, 1991. .
Khan, Iqtidar Alam. Historical dictionary of medieval India. Scarecrow Press, 2008. .
Langer, Lawrence N. Historical dictionary of medieval Russia. Scarecrow Press, 2002. .
Lexikon des Mittelalters online (LexMA). Brepols. Available online here. (German).
Loyn, H. R. Middle Ages: A Concise Encyclopedia. Thames & Hudson, 1989.
Meri, Josef W., Jere L. Bacharach. Medieval Islamic civilization: An encyclopedia. Routledge, 2006. .
Meyer, Otto, Renate Klauser. Clavis mediaevalis: Kleines Wörterbuch der Mittelalterforschung. O. Harrassowitz, 1962. (German).
Murray, Alan V. The Crusades: An encyclopedia. ABC-CLIO, 2006. .
Nicol, Donald MacGillivray. A biographical dictionary of the Byzantine Empire. Seaby, 1991. .
ORB: The online reference book for medieval studies. Kathryn Talarico College of Staten Island, City University of New York. Available online here.
Pulsiano, Phillip, Kirsten Wolf, Paul Acker. Medieval Scandinavia: An encyclopedia. Garland, 1993. .
Rosser, John H. Historical dictionary of Byzantium. Scarecrow Press, 2001. .
Roth, Norman. Medieval Jewish civilization: An encyclopedia. Routledge, 2003. .
Slack, Corliss Konwiser. Historical dictionary of the crusades. Scarecrow Press, 2003. .
Snodgrass, Mary Ellen, Linda Campbell Franklin. Who's who in the Middle Ages. McFarland, 2001. .
Strayer, Joseph R. Dictionary of the Middle Ages. Scribner's, 1982-1989.
Vauchez, André, R. B. Dobson, Michael Lapidge. Encyclopedia of the Middle Ages. Editions du Cerf; Fitzroy Dearborn; Città nuova, 2000. .
Xiong, Victor Cunrui. Historical dictionary of medieval China. Scarecrow Press, 2009. .

Renaissance
Bergin, Thomas G. and Jennifer Speake. Encyclopedia of the Renaissance. Facts on File, 1987.
Bergin, Thomas Goddard, Jennifer Speake. Encyclopedia of the Renaissance and the Reformation. Facts on File, 2004. .
Bietenholz, Peter G., Thomas B. Deutscher. Contemporaries of Erasmus: a biographical register of the Renaissance and Reformation. University of Toronto Press, 1985–1987. .
Campbell, Gordon. The Oxford dictionary of the Renaissance. Oxford University Press, 2003. .
Grendler, Paul F., Renaissance Society of America. Encyclopedia of the Renaissance. Scribner's in association with the Renaissance Society of America, 1999. .
Nauert, Charles Garfield. Historical dictionary of the Renaissance. Scarecrow Press, 2004. .
Robin, Diana Maury, Anne R. Larsen, Carole Levin. Encyclopedia of women in the Renaissance: Italy, France, and England. ABC-CLIO, 2007. .

Reformation
Bergin, Thomas Goddard, Jennifer Speake. Encyclopedia of the Renaissance and the Reformation. Facts on File, 2004. .
Bietenholz, Peter G., Thomas B. Deutscher. Contemporaries of Erasmus: a biographical register of the Renaissance and Reformation. University of Toronto Press, 1985–1987. .

20th Century
Brownstone, David and Irene Franck. Dictionary of 20th Century History. Prentice Hall, 1990.
Burnett, Thom.  Conspiracy Encyclopedia: The Encyclopedia of Conspiracy Theories
Drexel, John. The Facts on File Encyclopedia of the 20th Century. Facts on File, 1991. 
Palmowski, Jan. A dictionary of contemporary world history: From 1900 to the present day. Oxford University Press, 2003. .
Pons, Silvio, Robert Service, Mark Epstein, Charles Townsend. A dictionary of 20th-century communism. Princeton University Press, 2010. .
Sader, Emir. Latinoamericana: Enciclopedia contemporanea da America Latina e do Caribe. Laboratorio de Politicas Publicas; Boitempo Editorial, [2006?]. .
Teed, Peter. Dictionary of Twentieth-Century History. Oxford University Press, 1992.
Tucker, Spencer. Encyclopedia of the Cold War: A political, social, and military history. ABC-CLIO, 2007. .
Yust, Walter. 10 eventful years: A record of events of the years preceding, including and following World War II, 1937 through 1946. Encyclopædia Britannica, [1947].
Zeleza, Tiyambe, Dickson Eyoh. Encyclopedia of twentieth-century African history. Routledge, 2003. .

Holocaust
Epstein, Eric Joseph, Philip Rosen, Henry R. Huttenbach. Dictionary of the Holocaust: Biography, geography, and terminology. Greenwood Press, 1997. .
Fischel, Jack. Historical dictionary of the Holocaust. Scarecrow Press, 1999. .
Laqueur, Walter, Judith Tydor Baumel. The Holocaust encyclopedia. Yale University Press, 2001. .
Niewyk, Donald L., Francis R. Nicosia. The Columbia guide to the Holocaust. Columbia University Press, 2000. .
Spector, Shmuel, Robert Rozett. Encyclopedia of the Holocaust. Facts on File, 2000. .
Spector, Shmuel, Geoffrey Wigoder. The encyclopedia of Jewish life before and during the Holocaust. Yad Vashem; New York University Press, 2001. .

History of mathematics
Grrattan-Guinness, Ivor. Companion Encyclopedia of the History and Philosophy of the Mathematical Sciences. Routledge, 1993.

History of medicine
Bynum, W. F. and Roy Porter. Companion Encyclopedia of the History of Medicine. Routledge, 1994.
Kohn, George C. Encyclopedia of plague and pestilence: From ancient times to the present. Facts On File, 2007. ; .
McGrew, Roderick E. and Margaret P. McGrew. Encyclopedia of Medical History. McGraw-Hill, 1985.

History of psychology
Howells, John G. & M. Livia Osborn. A Reference Companion to the History of Abnormal Psychology. Greenwood, 1984.

History of science
Asimov, Isaac. Asimov's Chronology of Science and Discovery. HarperCollins, 1989. 
Bynum, William F. Dictionary of the History of Science. Princeton University Press, 1981.
Gascoigne, Robert Mortimer. Chronology of the History of Science, 1450-1900. Garland, 1987.
Hellemans, Alexander and Bryan Bunch. Timetables of Science: A Chronology of the Most Important People and Events in the History of Science. Simon & Schuster, 1988.
History of Science and Technology: A Narrative Chronology. Facts on File, 1988.
McNeil, Ian. An Encyclopedia of the History of Technology. Routledge, 1990. 
Mount, Ellis and Barbara List. Milestones in Science and Technology: The Ready Reference Guide to Discoveries, Inventions, and Facts. 2nd ed., Oryx, 1993.
Murray, Tim. Milestones in archaeology: A chronological encyclopedia. ABC-CLIO, 2007. .
Parkinson, Claire. Breakthroughs: A Chronology of Great Achievements in Science and Mathematics, 1200-1930. G.K. Hall, 1985.

Jewish history
Epstein, Eric Joseph, Philip Rosen, Henry R. Huttenbach. Dictionary of the Holocaust: Biography, geography, and terminology. Greenwood Press, 1997. .
Gribetz, Judah. Timetables of Jewish History: A Chronology of the Most Important People and Events in Jewish History. Simon & Schuster, 1993.
Kantor, Mattis. Jewish Time Line Encyclopedia. Jason Aronson, 1989.
Medoff, Rafael, Chaim Isaac Waxman. Historical dictionary of Zionism. Scarecrow Press, 2000. .
Niewyk, Donald L., Francis R. Nicosia. The Columbia guide to the Holocaust. Columbia University Press, 2000. .
Roth, Norman. Medieval Jewish civilization: An encyclopedia. Routledge, 2003. .
Shamir, Ilana and Shlomo Shavit. Young Reader's Encyclopedia of Jewish History. Viking Kestral, 1987.
Spector, Shmuel, Geoffrey Wigoder. The encyclopedia of Jewish life before and during the Holocaust. Yad Vashem; New York University Press, 2001. .

Military history

Regional history
Canby, Courtlandt. Encyclopedia of Historic Places. Facts on File, 1984.
Esposito, John L. The Oxford encyclopedia of the modern Islamic world. Oxford University Press, 1995. .

Africa
Appiah, Anthony, Henry Louis Gates. Africana: The encyclopedia of the African and African American experience. Oxford University Press, 2005. .
Arnold, Guy. Historical dictionary of civil wars in Africa. Scarecrow Press, 2008. .
Collins, Robert O. Historical dictionary of pre-colonial Africa. Scarecrow Press, 2001. .
Diagram Group. Encyclopedia of African peoples. Facts on File, 2000. .
Falola, Toyin. Key events in African history: A reference guide. Greenwood Press, 2002. .
Lye, Keith, Diagram Group. Encyclopedia of African nations and civilizations. Facts on File, 2002. .
Middleton, John, Joseph Calder Miller. New encyclopedia of Africa. Thomson/Gale, 2008. .
Page, Willie F., Facts on File. Encyclopedia of African history and culture. Facts on File, 2001. .
Shillington, Kevin. Encyclopedia of African history. Fitzroy Dearborn, 2005. .
The United States in Africa: A Historical Dictionary. Greenwood, 1989.
Vogel, Joseh O., Jean Vogel. Encyclopedia of precolonial Africa: Archaeology, history, languages, cultures, and environments. AltaMira Press, 1997. .
Zeleza, Tiyambe, Dickson Eyoh. Encyclopedia of twentieth-century African history. Routledge, 2003. .

African islands

Mauritius
Gascoigne, Bamber. Encyclopedia of Britain. Macmillan, 1993. .

Mayotte
Sellier, Jean, Anne. Le Fur, Bertrand de Brun. Atlas historique des provinces et régions de France: Genèse d'un peuple. La Découverte, 1997. .

Réunion
Sellier, Jean, Anne. Le Fur, Bertrand de Brun. Atlas historique des provinces et régions de France: Genèse d'un peuple. La Découverte, 1997. .

Seychelles
Gascoigne, Bamber. Encyclopedia of Britain. Macmillan, 1993. .

North Africa
Clements, Frank. Historical dictionary of Arab and Islamic organizations. Scarecrow Press, 2001. .
Dumper, Michael, Bruce E. Stanley, Janet L. Abu-Lughod. Cities of the Middle East and North Africa: A historical encyclopedia. ABC-CLIO, 2007. .
International encyclopaedia for the Middle Ages (IEMA): A supplement to LexMA-online. Brepols. Available online here.
Lexikon des Mittelalters online (LexMA). Brepols. Available online here. (German).
Mattar, Philip. Encyclopedia of the modern Middle East and North Africa. Macmillan Reference USA, 2004. .
Mawṣililī, Ahmad. Historical dictionary of Islamic fundamentalist movements in the Arab world, Iran, and Turkey. Scarecrow Press, 1999. .
Somel, Selçuk Akşin. Historical dictionary of the Ottoman Empire. Scarecrow Press, 2003. .
Talhami, Ghada Hashem. Historical dictionary of women in the Middle East and North Africa. Scarecrow Press, 2013. .
Who's who in the Arab world. Publitec Editions, 1966–. .

Algeria
Naylor, Phillip Chiviges.Historical dictionary of Algeria. Scarecrow Press, 2006. .

Egypt
Coughlin, Kathryn M. Muslim cultures today: A reference guide. Greenwood Press, 2006. .
Goldschmidt, Arthur, Robert Johnston. Historical dictionary of Egypt. Scarecrow Press, 2003. .
Lobban, Richard. Historical dictionary of ancient and medieval Nubia. Scarecrow Press, 2004. .

Ancient Egypt
Bard, Kathryn A., Steven Blake Shubert. Encyclopedia of the archaeology of ancient Egypt. Routledge, 1999. .
Bierbrier, M. L. Historical dictionary of ancient Egypt. Scarecrow Press, 1999. .
Bunson, Margaret. The Encyclopedia of Ancient Egypt. Facts on File, 2012. .
David, A. Rosalie, Antony E. David. A biographical dictionary of ancient Egypt. Seaby, 1992. .
Encyclopedia of Egyptology. University of California, Los Angeles. Available online here.
Morkot, Robert. Historical dictionary of ancient Egyptian warfare. Scarecrow Press, 2003. .
Redford, Donald B. The Oxford encyclopedia of ancient Egypt. Oxford University Press, 2001. .
Wilkinson, Toby A. H. The Thames and Hudson dictionary of ancient Egypt. Thames and Hudson, 2005. .

Libya
St. John, Ronald Bruce. Historical dictionary of Libya. Scarecrow Press, 2006. .

Morocco
Park, Thomas Kerlin, Aomar Boum. Historical dictionary of Morocco. Scarecrow Press, 2006. .

Sudan
Coughlin, Kathryn M. Muslim cultures today: A reference guide. Greenwood Press, 2006. .
Lobban, Richard. Historical dictionary of ancient and medieval Nubia. Scarecrow Press, 2004. .
Lobban, Richard, Robert S. Kramer, Carolyn Fluehr-Lobban. Historical dictionary of the Sudan. Scarecrow Press, 2002. .

Western Sahara
Pazzanita, Anthony G. Historical dictionary of Western Sahara. Scarecrow Press, 2006. .

Sub-Saharan Africa
Mays, Terr M., Mark DeLancey. Historical dictionary of international organizations in sub-Saharan Africa. Scarecrow Press, 2002. .
Middleton, John. Encyclopedia of Africa south of the Sahara. C. Scribner's Sons, 1997. .

Central Africa

Angola
James, W. Martin, Susan H. Broadhead. Historical dictionary of Angola. Scarecrow Press, 2004. .

Burundi
Eggers, Ellen K. Historical dictionary of Burundi. Scarecrow Press, 2006. .

Cameroon
Gascoigne, Bamber. Encyclopedia of Britain. Macmillan, 1993. .

Chad
Decalo, Samuel. Historical dictionary of Chad. Scarecrow Press, 1997. .

Equatorial Guinea
Liniger-Goumaz, Max. Historical dictionary of Equatorial Guinea. Scarecrow Press, 2000. .

Gabon
Gardinier, David E., Douglas A. Yates. Historical dictionary of Gabon. Scarecrow Press, 2006. .

Republic of the Congo
Decalo, Samuel, Virginia McLean Thompson, Richard Adloff. Historical dictionary of Congo. Scarecrow Press, 1996. .

Rwanda
Gascoigne, Bamber. Encyclopedia of Britain. Macmillan, 1993. .

East Africa

Burundi
Eggers, Ellen K. Historical dictionary of Burundi. Scarecrow Press, 2006. .

Kenya
Gascoigne, Bamber. Encyclopedia of Britain. Macmillan, 1993. .
Maxon, Robert M., Thomas P. Ofcansky. Historical dictionary of Kenya. Scarecrow Press, 2000. .

Madagascar
Allen, Philip M., Marueen Covell. Historical dictionary of Madagascar. Scarecrow Press, 2005. .

Malawi
Gascoigne, Bamber. Encyclopedia of Britain. Macmillan, 1993. .
Kalinga, Owen J. M., C. A. Crosby. Historical dictionary of Malawi. Scarecrow Press, 2001. .

Mozambique
Azevedo, Mario Joaquim, Emmanuel U. Nnadozie, Tombe Nhamitambo Mbuia-João. Historical dictionary of Mozambique. Scarecrow Press, 2003. .
Gascoigne, Bamber. Encyclopedia of Britain. Macmillan, 1993. .

Tanzania
Gascoigne, Bamber. Encyclopedia of Britain. Macmillan, 1993. .
Ofcansky, Thomas P., Rodger Yeager, Laura S. Kurtz. Historical dictionary of Tanzania. Scarecrow Press, 1997. .

Uganda
Gascoigne, Bamber. Encyclopedia of Britain. Macmillan, 1993. .

Horn of Africa
Clements, Frank. Historical dictionary of Arab and Islamic organizations. Scarecrow Press, 2001. .
Mawṣililī, Ahmad. Historical dictionary of Islamic fundamentalist movements in the Arab world, Iran, and Turkey. Scarecrow Press, 1999. .
Somel, Selçuk Akşin. Historical dictionary of the Ottoman Empire. Scarecrow Press, 2003. .

Djibouti
Alwan, Daoud Aboubaker, Yohanis Mibrathu. Historical dictionary of Djibouti. Scarecrow Press, 2000. .

Eritrea
Killion, Tom. Historical dictionary of Eritrea. Scarecrow Press, 1998. .

Ethiopia
Coughlin, Kathryn M. Muslim cultures today: A reference guide. Greenwood Press, 2006. .
Shinn, David Hamilton, Thomas P. Ofcansky, Chris Prouty. Historical dictionary of Ethiopia. Scarecrow Press, 2004. .

Somalia
Mukhtar, Mohamed Haji, Margaret Castagno. Historical dictionary of Somalia. Scarecrow Press, 2003. .

Southern Africa

Botswana
Gascoigne, Bamber. Encyclopedia of Britain. Macmillan, 1993. .
Ramsay, Jeff, Barry Morton, Fred Morton. Historical dictionary of Botswana. Scarecrow Press, 1996. .

Lesotho
Gascoigne, Bamber. Encyclopedia of Britain. Macmillan, 1993. .
Rosenberg, Scott, Richard Frederick Weisfelder, Michelle Frisbie-Fulton. Historical dictionary of Lesotho. Scarecrow Press, 2004. .

Madagascar
Allen, Philip M., Marueen Covell. Historical dictionary of Madagascar. Scarecrow Press, 2005. .

Namibia
Gascoigne, Bamber. Encyclopedia of Britain. Macmillan, 1993. .
Grotpeter, John J. Historical dictionary of Namibia. Scarecrow Press, 1994. .

South Africa
Gascoigne, Bamber. Encyclopedia of Britain. Macmillan, 1993. .
Saunders, Christopher C., Nicholas Southey, Mary-Lynn Suttie. Historical dictionary of South Africa. Scarecrow Press, 2000. .

Swaziland
Booth, Alan R., John J. Grotpeter. Historical dictionary of Swaziland. Scarecrow Press, 2000. .
Gascoigne, Bamber. Encyclopedia of Britain. Macmillan, 1993. .

Zambia
Gascoigne, Bamber. Encyclopedia of Britain. Macmillan, 1993. .
Simon, David, James R. Pletcher, Brian V. Siegel. Historical dictionary of Zambia. Scarecrow Press, 2008. .

Zimbabwe
Rubert, Steven C., R. Kent Rasmussen. Historical dictionary of Zimbabwe. Scarecrow Press, 2001. .

West Africa

Benin
Decalo, Samuel. Historical dictionary of Benin. Scarecrow Press, 1995. .

Burkina Faso
McFarland, Daniel Miles, Lawrence Rupley. Historical dictionary of Burkina Faso. Scarecrow Press, 1998. .

Ghana
Gascoigne, Bamber. Encyclopedia of Britain. Macmillan, 1993. .
Owusu-Ansah, David. Historical dictionary of Ghana. Scarecrow Press, 2005.

Guinea
O'Toole, Thomas, Janice E. Baker. Historical dictionary of Guinea. Scarecrow Press, 2005. .

Liberia
Dunn, D. Elwood, Amos Jones Beyan, Carl Patrick Burrowes. Historical dictionary of Liberia. Scarecrow Press, 2001. .

Mali
Imperato, Pascal James, Gavin H. Imperato. Historical dictionary of Mali. Scarecrow Press, 2008. .

Mauritania
Pazzanita, Anthony G., Alfred G. Gerteiny. Historical dictionary of Mauritania. Scarecrow Press, 1996. .

Niger
Decalo, Samuel. Historical dictionary of Niger. Scarecrow Press, 1997. .

Nigeria
Coughlin, Kathryn M. Muslim cultures today: A reference guide. Greenwood Press, 2006. .
Falola, Toyin, Ann Genova. Historical dictionary of Nigeria. Scarecrow Press, 2009. .
Gascoigne, Bamber. Encyclopedia of Britain. Macmillan, 1993. .

Sierra Leone
Fyle, C. Magbaily, Cyril P. Foray. Historical dictionary of Sierra Leone. Scarecrow Press, 2006. .
Gascoigne, Bamber. Encyclopedia of Britain. Macmillan, 1993. .

Americas
Bedini, Silvio. The Christopher Columbus Encyclopedia. Simon & Schuster, 1992. 
Provost, Foster. Columbus Dictionary. Omnigraphics, 1991.
Sabin, Joseph, Wilberforce Eames, R. W. G. Vail Bibliographical Society of America. A dictionary of books relating to America, from its discovery to the present time. Joseph Sabin, 1868–1936.

Caribbean
Atkinson, Nadine C. The Caribbean history pocket encyclopedia. Arawak, 2003. .
Balderston, Daniel, Mike Gonzalez, Ana M. López. Encyclopedia of contemporary Latin American and Caribbean cultures. Routledge, 2000. .
Collier, Simon, Thomas E. Skidmore, Harold Blakemore. The Cambridge encyclopedia of Latin America and the Caribbean. Cambridge University Press, 1992. .
Désormeaux, Emile, & Jean Baptiste Du Tertre1. Antilles d'hier et d'aujourd'hui: Tout l'univers antillais du début de la colonisation à nos jours. Désormeaux, [1978–].
Hallewell, Laurence. Historical dictionaries of Latin America. Scarecrow, 1967–. .
Kinsbruner, Jay, Erick Detlef Langer. Encyclopedia of Latin American history and culture. Gale, 2008. .
Sader, Emir. Latinoamericana: Enciclopedia contemporanea da America Latina e do Caribe. Laboratorio de Politicas Publicas; Boitempo Editorial, [2006?]. .
Saunders, Nicholas J. Peoples of the Caribbean: An encyclopedia of archeology and traditional culture. ABC-CLIO, 2005. .
Tenenbaum, Barbara A. Latin America, history and culture: An encyclopedia for students. Macmillan Library Reference, 1999. .

Anguilla
Carty, Brenda, Coleville L. Petty. Anguilla: Tranquil isle of the Caribbean. Macmillan Education, 2000.
Gascoigne, Bamber. Encyclopedia of Britain. Macmillan, 1993. .

Antigua and Barbuda
Gascoigne, Bamber. Encyclopedia of Britain. Macmillan, 1993. .

Aruba

Bahamas
Gascoigne, Bamber. Encyclopedia of Britain. Macmillan, 1993. .

Barbados
Fraser, Henry, John Gilmore, Sean Carrington. A–Z of Barbados heritage. Macmillan Caribbean, 2003. ; .
Gascoigne, Bamber. Encyclopedia of Britain. Macmillan, 1993. .

Bonaire

British Virgin Islands

Caribbean Netherlands

Cayman Islands
Gascoigne, Bamber. Encyclopedia of Britain. Macmillan, 1993. .

Cuba
Enciclopedia y Clásicos Cubanos, inc. La enciclopedia de Cuba. Enciclopedia y Clásicos Cubanos, 1975–1977. .
Ezquerra, Jaime Alvar. Diccionario Espasa historia de España y América. Espasa, 2002. .
Martínez-Fernández, Luis. Encyclopedia of Cuba: People, history, culture. Greenwood Press, 2003. .
Suchlicki, Jaime. Historical dictionary of Cuba. Scarecrow Press, 2001. .
Tucker, Spencer D., James Arnold, Roberta Wiener, Paul G. Pierpaoli, Jack McCallum, Justin D. Murphy. The encyclopedia of the Spanish-American and Philippine-American wars: A political, social, and military history. ABC-CLIO, 2009. .

Curaçao

Dominica
Gascoigne, Bamber. Encyclopedia of Britain. Macmillan, 1993. .

Dominican Republic
Enciclopedia dominicana. Enciclopédia Dominicana, 2000. .
Ramos, Alejandro Paulino, Aquiles Castro. Diccionario de cultura y folklore dominicano. ABC Editorial, 2005. .

French Antilles
Corzani, Jack. Dictionnaire encyclopedique Desormeaux. Editions Desormeuax, [1992–1993]. .

Grenada
Gascoigne, Bamber. Encyclopedia of Britain. Macmillan, 1993. .

Guadeloupe
Corzani, Jack. Dictionnaire encyclopedique Desormeaux. Editions Desormeuax, [1992–1993]. .
Sellier, Jean, Anne. Le Fur, Bertrand de Brun. Atlas historique des provinces et régions de France: Genèse d'un peuple. La Découverte, 1997. .

Haiti
Oriol, Michèle, Corinne Wieser. Histoire et dictionnaire de la révolution et de l'indépendance d'Haïti, 1789–1804. Fondation pour la Recherche Iconographique et Documentaire, 2002. .

Jamaica
Gascoigne, Bamber. Encyclopedia of Britain. Macmillan, 1993. .
Senior, Olive. Encyclopedia of Jamaican heritage. Twin Guinep, 2003. .

Martinique
Corzani, Jack. Dictionnaire encyclopedique Desormeaux. Editions Desormeuax, [1992–1993]. .
Sellier, Jean, Anne. Le Fur, Bertrand de Brun. Atlas historique des provinces et régions de France: Genèse d'un peuple. La Découverte, 1997. .

Montserrat
Gascoigne, Bamber. Encyclopedia of Britain. Macmillan, 1993. .

Puerto Rico
Fernandez, Ronald, Serafin Méndez Méndez, Gail Cueto. Puerto Rico past and present: An encyclopedia. Greenwood Press, 1998. .
Sugrañes, José A. Toro. Nueva enciclopedia de Puerto Rico. Editorial Lector, 1995. .

Saba
Hoetink, H. Encyclopedie van de Nederlandse Antillen. Elsevier, 1969.

Saint Barthélemy
Sellier, Jean, Anne. Le Fur, Bertrand de Brun. Atlas historique des provinces et régions de France: Genèse d'un peuple. La Découverte, 1997. .

Saint Kitts and Nevis
Gascoigne, Bamber. Encyclopedia of Britain. Macmillan, 1993. .

Saint Lucia
Gascoigne, Bamber. Encyclopedia of Britain. Macmillan, 1993. .

Saint Martin
Sellier, Jean, Anne. Le Fur, Bertrand de Brun. Atlas historique des provinces et régions de France: Genèse d'un peuple. La Découverte, 1997. .

Saint Vincent and the Grenadines
Gascoigne, Bamber. Encyclopedia of Britain. Macmillan, 1993. .

Sint Eustatius
Hoetink, H. Encyclopedie van de Nederlandse Antillen. Elsevier, 1969.

Sint Maarten
Hoetink, H. Encyclopedie van de Nederlandse Antillen. Elsevier, 1969.

Trinidad and Tobago
Gascoigne, Bamber. Encyclopedia of Britain. Macmillan, 1993. .

Turks and Caicos Islands
Gascoigne, Bamber. Encyclopedia of Britain. Macmillan, 1993. .

U. S. Virgin Islands

Central America
Balderston, Daniel, Mike Gonzalez, Ana M. López. Encyclopedia of contemporary Latin American and Caribbean cultures. Routledge, 2000. .
Bunson, Margaret, Stephen Bunson. Encyclopedia of ancient Mesoamerica. Facts on File, 1996. .
Carrasco, David. The Oxford encyclopedia of Mesoamerican cultures: The civilizations of Mexico and Central America. Oxford University Press, 2001. .
Collier, Simon, Thomas E. Skidmore, Harold Blakemore. The Cambridge encyclopedia of Latin America and the Caribbean. Cambridge University Press, 1992. .
Evans, Susan Toby, David L. Webster. Archaeology of ancient Mexico and Central America: An encyclopedia. Garland, 2001. .
Hallewell, Laurence. Historical dictionaries of Latin America. Scarecrow, 1967–. .
Kinsbruner, Jay, Erick Detlef Langer. Encyclopedia of Latin American history and culture. Gale, 2008. .
Phillips, Charles, David M. Jones. The illustrated encyclopedia of Aztec and Maya: The history, legend, myth and culture of the ancient native peoples of Mexico and Central America. Lorenz, 2004. .
Sader, Emir. Latinoamericana: Enciclopedia contemporanea da America Latina e do Caribe. Laboratorio de Politicas Publicas; Boitempo Editorial, [2006?]. .
Smith, Joseph. Historical dictionary of United States–Latin American relations. Scarecrow Press, 2007. .
Tenenbaum, Barbara A. Latin America, history and culture: An encyclopedia for students. Macmillan Library Reference, 1999. .

Belize
Gascoigne, Bamber. Encyclopedia of Britain. Macmillan, 1993. .

Costa Rica
D'Angelo, G., Carlos Gispert. Enciclopedia de Costa Rica. Océano, 2001. .
Ezquerra, Jaime Alvar. Diccionario Espasa historia de España y América. Espasa, 2002. .
Gutierrez, Pedro Rafael. Calendario historico: 500 anos de historia de Costa Rica. Universidad Autonoma de Centro America, 1988. .

Dominican Republic
Ezquerra, Jaime Alvar. Diccionario Espasa historia de España y América. Espasa, 2002. .

El Salvador
Cardenal, Rodolfo. Enciclopedia de El Salvador. Océano, [2001]. .
Ezquerra, Jaime Alvar. Diccionario Espasa historia de España y América. Espasa, 2002. .
Peñate, Óscar Martínez and María Elena Sánchez. El Salvador, diccionario: Personajes, hechos históricos, geografía e instituciones. Editorial Nuevo Enfoque, 2000. .

Guatemala
Ezquerra, Jaime Alvar. Diccionario Espasa historia de España y América. Espasa, 2002. .

Honduras
d'Angelo, Graciela. Enciclopedia de Honduras. Océano Grupo Editorial, 2004. .
Ezquerra, Jaime Alvar. Diccionario Espasa historia de España y América. Espasa, 2002. .
Ortega, Ramiro Colindres, Oscar Armando Valladares. Enciclopedia histórica de Honduras. Graficentro Editores, 1989.
O, Ramiro Colindres. Enciclopedia hondureña ilustrada: De personajes históricos y figuras contemporáneos. Graficentro Editores, 1994.

Nicaragua
Ezquerra, Jaime Alvar. Diccionario Espasa historia de España y América. Espasa, 2002. .
Gispert, Carlos. Enciclopedia de Nicaragua. Oceano, 2003. .

Panama
Ezquerra, Jaime Alvar. Diccionario Espasa historia de España y América. Espasa, 2002. .

North America
Cooke, Jacob Ernest, W. J. Eccles, Mathé Allain. Encyclopedia of the North American colonies. Charles Scribner's Sons; Macmillan Canada; Macmillan International, 1993. .
Keller, Rosemary Skinner, Rosemary Radford Ruether, Marie Cantlon. Encyclopedia of women and religion in North America. Indiana University Press, 2006. .
Miller, Randall and John D. Smith. Dictionary of Afro-American Slavery. Greenwood, 1988.
Zhou, Peter X. Collecting Asia: East Asian libraries in North America, 1868–2008. Association for Asian Studies, 2010. .

Bermuda
Gascoigne, Bamber. Encyclopedia of Britain. Macmillan, 1993. .

Canada
 Bercuson, David, J. L. Granatstein. Canadian military history. Oxford University Press, 1992. .
 James Harley Marsh ed.: The Canadian Encyclopedia L'encyclopédie canadienne, Historica Canada, 2000. Online edition constantly updated and bilingual
 Ciment, James, Thaddeus Russell. The home front encyclopedia: United States, Britain, and Canada in World Wars I and II. ABC-CLIO, 2007. .
 Encyclopedia of Saskatchewan.  University of Regina.
 Gascoigne, Bamber. Encyclopedia of Britain. Macmillan, 1993. .
 Gough, Barry M. Historical dictionary of Canada. Scarecrow Press, 1999. .
Hayes, Derek. Historical atlas of the Arctic. Douglas and McIntyre; University of Washington Press, 2003. .
 Holland, Clive. Arctic exploration and development, c. 500 B.C. to 1915: An encyclopedia. Garland Publ., 1994. .
 Lamar, Howard Roberts. The new encyclopedia of the American West. Yale University Press, 1998. .
 Mills, William J. Exploring polar frontiers: A historical encyclopedia. ABC-CLIO, 2003. .
 Myers, Jan. The Fitzhenry & Whiteside Book of Canadian Facts and Dates. Fitzhenry & Whiteside, 1986.
 New, W H: The Encyclopedia of Canadian Literature. University of Toronto, 2002
Nuttall, Mark. Encyclopedia of the Arctic. Routledge, 2005. .
Story, Norah. Oxford Companion to Canadian History and Literature. Oxford University Press, 1967.

Greenland
Hayes, Derek. Historical atlas of the Arctic. Douglas and McIntyre; University of Washington Press, 2003. .
Holland, Clive. Arctic exploration and development, c. 500 B.C. to 1915: An encyclopedia. Garland Publ., 1994. .
Mills, William J. Exploring polar frontiers: A historical encyclopedia. ABC-CLIO, 2003. .
Nuttall, Mark. Encyclopedia of the Arctic. Routledge, 2005. .

Mexico
Alvarez, José Rogelio. Enciclopedia de México. Enciclopedia de México, 1998. .
Arellanes, Anselmo. Diccionario histórico de la revolución en Oaxaca. [IIS] UABJO; IEEPO, 1997. .
Carrasco, David. The Oxford encyclopedia of Mesoamerican cultures: The civilizations of Mexico and Central America. Oxford University Press, 2001. .
Coerver, Don M., Suzanne B. Pasztor, Robert Buffington. Mexico: An encyclopedia of contemporary culture and history. ABC-CLIO, 2004. .
Collier, Simon, Thomas E. Skidmore, Harold Blakemore. The Cambridge encyclopedia of Latin America and the Caribbean. Cambridge University Press, 1992. .
Dent, David W. Encyclopedia of modern Mexico. Scarecrow Press, 2002. .
Evans, Susan Toby, David L. Webster. Archaeology of ancient Mexico and Central America: An encyclopedia. Garland, 2001. .
Ezquerra, Jaime Alvar. Diccionario Espasa historia de España y América. Espasa, 2002. .
Fernández, Roberto Peredo, Octavio Ochoa Contreras, Gialuanna Ayora Vázquez. Diccionario enciclopédico veracruzano. Universidad Veracruzana, 1993. .
Frazier, Donald S. The United States and Mexico at war: Nineteenth-century expansionism and conflict. Macmillan Reference USA, 1998. .
García, Carlos Román. Diccionario enciclopédico de Chiapas. Consejo Estatal para la Cultura y las Artes de Chiapas; Universidad de Ciencias y Artes del Estado de Chiapas, 2000. .
Guerrero Cultural Siglo XXI, A.C. Diccionario enciclopédico del Estado de Guerrero. Guerrero Cultural Siglo XXI, A.C, 1999.
Hallewell, Laurence. Historical dictionaries of Latin America. Scarecrow, 1967–. .
Higuera, Salvador Mateos. Enciclopedia gráfica del México antiguo. Secretaría de Hacienda y Crédito Público, 1992–[1994]. .
Instituto Nacional de Estudios Históricos de la Revolución Mexicana. Diccionario histórico y biográfico de la Revolución Mexicana. Instituto Nacional de Estudios Históricos de la Revolución Mexicana, Secretaría de Gobernación, 1990–1994. .
Kinsbruner, Jay, Erick Detlef Langer. Encyclopedia of Latin American history and culture. Gale, 2008. .
Lamar, Howard Roberts. The new encyclopedia of the American West. Yale University Press, 1998. .
Musacchio, Humberto. Diccionario enciclopédico del Distrito Federal. Hoja Casa Editorial, 2000. .
Musacchio, Humberto. Milenios de México. Hoja Casa Editorial, 1999. .
Phillips, Charles, David M. Jones. The illustrated encyclopedia of Aztec and Maya: The history, legend, myth and culture of the ancient native peoples of Mexico and Central America. Lorenz, 2004. .
Pinzon, Soledad Mata, Carlos Zolla, Diego Méndez Granados Instituto Nacional Indigenista (Mexico). Diccionario enciclopédico de la medicina tradicional mexicana. Instituto Nacional Indigenista, 1994. .
Diccionario Porrúa de historia, biografía y geografía de México. Editorial Porrúa, 1995. .
Smith, Joseph. Historical dictionary of United States–Latin American relations. Scarecrow Press, 2007. .
Werner, Michael S., Tom Willcockson, Robert M. Salkin. Encyclopedia of Mexico: History, society and culture. Fitzroy Dearborn, 1997. .

Saint Pierre and Miquelon
Sellier, Jean, Anne. Le Fur, Bertrand de Brun. Atlas historique des provinces et régions de France: Genèse d'un peuple. La Découverte, 1997. .

United States
Abramson, Rudy, Jean Haskell, Jill Oxendine. Encyclopedia of Appalachia. University of Tennessee Press, 2006. .
Adams, James T. Dictionary of American History. Rev. ed., Scribner's, 1976. 
Atlas of American History. 2nd ed., Scribner's, 1984. 
Becker, William H. The Encyclopedia of American Business History and Biography. Facts on File/Bruccoli Clark Layman, 1988-.
Benowitz, June Melby. Encyclopedia of American women and religion. ABC-CLIO, 1998. .
Boyer, Paul S., Melvyn Dubofsky. The Oxford companion to United States history. Oxford University Press, 2001. .
Bradley, David, Shelley Fisher Fishkin. The encyclopedia of civil rights in America. Sharpe Reference, 1998. .
Browne, Ray Broadus, Pat Browne. The guide to United States popular culture. Bowling Green State University Popular Press, 2001. .
Buenker, John D., Joseph Buenker. Encyclopedia of the Gilded Age and Progressive Era. Sharpe Reference, 2005. .
Carruth, Gorton. The Encyclopedia of American Facts and Dates. 9th ed., HarperCollins, 1997. .
Cayton, Mary Kupiec, Peter W. Williams. Encyclopedia of American cultural and intellectual history. Scribner, 2001. .
Cayton, Mary Kupiec, Elliott J. Gorn, Peter W. Williams. Encyclopedia of American Social History. Scribner's; Maxwell Macmillan Canada; Maxwell Macmillan International, 1993. .
Ciment, James. Colonial America: An encyclopedia of social, political, cultural, and economic history. Sharpe Reference, 2006. .
Ciment, James. Encyclopedia of American immigration. M.E. Sharpe, 2001. .
Ciment, James, Thaddeus Russell. The home front encyclopedia: United States, Britain, and Canada in World Wars I and II. ABC-CLIO, 2007. .
Ciment, James.  Postwar America: An encyclopedia of social, political, cultural, and economic history. M. E. Sharpe, 2006. .
Clinton, Catherine, Christine A. Lunardini. The Columbia guide to American women in the nineteenth century. Columbia University Press, 2000. .
Concise Dictionary of American History. Scribner's, 1983. 
Corps, Terry. Historical dictionary of the Jacksonian era and Manifest Destiny. Scarecrow Press, 2006. .
Cullen-DuPont, Kathryn. Encyclopedia of women's history in America. Facts on File, 2000. .
Davis, Richard C. Encyclopedia of American forest and conservation history. Macmillan; Collier Macmillan, 1983. . 
DeConde, Alexander, Richard Dean Burns, Fredrik Logevall. Encyclopedia of American foreign policy. Scribner, 2002. .
Dictionary of American Biography. Scribner's, 1928-. 
Duchak, Alicia. A–Z of modern America. Routledge, 1999. .
Encyclopedia of the North American Colonies. 1993.
Faragher, John M. The Encyclopedia of Colonial and Revolutionary America. Facts on File, 1989. 
Ferris, William. The Greenwood encyclopedia of American regional cultures. Greenwood Press, 2004. .
Finkelman, Paul. Encyclopedia of the new American nation: The emergence of the United States, 1754–1829. Charles Scribner's Sons; Thomson Gale, 2006. .
Foner, Eric. Freedom's lawmakers: A directory of black officeholders during Reconstruction. Louisiana State University Press, 1996. .
Foner, Eric and John Garraty. The Reader's Companion to American History. Houghton Mifflin, 1991. 
Frazier, Donald S. The United States and Mexico at war: Nineteenth-century expansionism and conflict. Macmillan Reference USA, 1998. .
Goldfield, David R. Encyclopedia of American urban history. Sage, 2007. .
Gordon, Lois G., Alan Gordon. American chronicle: Year by year through the twentieth century. Yale University Press, 1999. .
Hahn, Peter L. Historical dictionary of United States–Middle East relations. Scarecrow Press, 2007. .
Johnson, Thomas Herbert. Oxford Companion to American History. Oxford University Press, 1966.
Kammen, Carol, Norma Prendergast. Encyclopedia of local history. AltaMira Press, 2000. .
Kane, Joseph Nathan. Facts About the Presidents. 6th ed., H. W. Wilson, 1993.
Kane, Joseph Nathan. Facts About the States. H. W. Wilson, 1989.
Kane, Joseph Nathan, Steven Anzovin, Janet Podell. Famous first facts: A record of first happenings, discoveries, and inventions in American history. H. W. Wilson, 2006. . 
Knight, Peter. Conspiracy theories in American history: An encyclopedia. ABC-CLIO, 2003. .
Kumaraswamy, P. R. Historical dictionary of the Arab-Israeli conflict. Scarecrow Press, 2006. .
Kutler Stanley I. Dictionary of American history. Charles Scribner's Sons, 2003. .
Kutler, Stanley I., Robert Dallek, David A. Hollinger. Encyclopedia of the United States in the twentieth century. Charles Scribner's Sons; Simon & Schuster; Prentice Hall International, 1996. .
Mankiller, Wilma Pearl. The reader's companion to U.S. women's history. Houghton Mifflin, 1998. .
Matray, James Irving. East Asia and the United States: An encyclopedia of relations since 1784. Greenwood Press, 2002. .
Mays, Dorothy A. Women in early America: Struggle, survival, and freedom in a new world. ABC-CLIO, 2004. .
McElvaine, Robert S. Encyclopedia of the Great Depression. Macmillan Reference USA, 2004. .
Middleton, Ken. American women's history: A research guide. .
Moreno, Barry. Encyclopedia of Ellis Island. Greenwood Press, 2004. .
Morris, Richard B. Encyclopedia of American History. 6th ed., HarperCollins, 1982. 
Morris, Richard Brandon and Jeffrey Brandon Morris. Encyclopedia of American history. Harper Collins, 1996. .
Ness, Immanuel, Stephen Eric Bronner, Frances Fox Piven. Encyclopedia of American social movements. Sharpe Reference, 2004. .
Olson, James S. and Susan Wladaver-Morgan. Dictionary of United States Economic History. Greenwood, 1992.
Porter, Glenn. Encyclopedia of American Economic History: Studies of the Principal Movements and Ideas. Scribner's, 1980.
Queen, Edward L., Stephen R. Prothero, Gardiner H. Shattuck. Encyclopedia of American religious history. Facts on File, 2001. .
Schlesinger, Arthur, Jr. Almanac of American History. 
Scribner Desk Dictionary of American History. Scribner's, 1984. 
Shavit, David. United States in Asia: A Historical Dictionary. Greenwood, 1990. .
Shifflett, Crandall A. Victorian America, 1876 to 1913. Facts on File, 1996. .
Sifakis, Carl. The mafia encyclopedia. Facts on File, 2005. .
Smith, Joseph. Historical dictionary of United States–Latin American relations. Scarecrow Press, 2007. .
Sutter, Robert G. Historical dictionary of Chinese foreign policy. Scarecrow Press, 2011. .
The United States in Africa: A Historical Dictionary. Greenwood, 1989.
The United States in Asia: A Historical Dictionary. Greenwood, 1990.
The United States in the Middle East: A Historical Dictionary. Greenwood, 1988.
Tucker, Spencer D., James Arnold, Roberta Wiener, Paul G. Pierpaoli, Jack McCallum, Justin D. Murphy. The encyclopedia of the Spanish-American and Philippine-American wars: A political, social, and military history. ABC-CLIO, 2009. .
Urdang, Laurence. Timetables of American History. Simon & Schuster, 1981.
Van Sant, John E., Peter Mauch, Yoneyuki Sugita. Historical dictionary of United States–Japan relations. Scarecrow Press, 2007. .
Wakelyn, Jon L. Birth of the Bill of Rights: Encyclopedia of the Antifederalists. Greenwood Press, 2004. .
Weatherbee, Donald E. Historical dictionary of United States–Southeast Asia relations. Scarecrow Press, 2008. .
Wintz, Cary D., Paul Finkelman. Encyclopedia of the Harlem Renaissance. Routledge, 2004. .
Wynar, Lubomyr Roman, Anna T. Wynar. Encyclopedic directory of ethnic newspapers and periodicals in the United States. Libraries Unlimited, 1976. .
Yanak, Ted and Pam Cornelison. Great American History Fact-Finder. Houghton Mifflin, 1993.

Alaska
Hayes, Derek. Historical atlas of the Arctic. Douglas and McIntyre; University of Washington Press, 2003. .
Holland, Clive. Arctic exploration and development, c. 500 B.C. to 1915: An encyclopedia. Garland Publ., 1994. .
Mills, William J. Exploring polar frontiers: A historical encyclopedia. ABC-CLIO, 2003. .
Nuttall, Mark. Encyclopedia of the Arctic. Routledge, 2005. .

American West
Cusic, Don. Cowboys and the Wild West: An A–Z guide from the Chisholm Trail to the silver screen. Facts on File, 1994. .
Lamar, Howard Roberts. The new encyclopedia of the American West. Yale University Press, 1998. .
Lamar, Howard R. The Reader's Encyclopedia of the American West. HarperCollins, 1977. 
McLoughlin, Denis. Wild and Woolly: An Encyclopedia of the American West. Doubleday, 1975.
Nestor, Sandy. Silver and gold mining camps of the old West: A state by state American encyclopedia. McFarland, 2007. .

Midwest
Sisson, Richard, Christian K. Zacher, Andrew R. L. Cayton. The American Midwest: An interpretive encyclopedia. Indiana University Press, 2007. .

New England
Feintuch, Burt, David H. Watters. The encyclopedia of New England: The culture and history of an American region. Yale University Press, 2005. .

Southern United States
Current, Richard Nelson, Paul D. Escott. Encyclopedia of the Confederacy. Simon & Schuster, 1993–. .
Richter, William L. Historical dictionary of the Old South. Scarecrow Press, 2006. .
Riley, Sam G. Magazines of the American South. Greenwood Press, 1986. .
Twyman, Robert W. and David C. Roller. The Encyclopedia of Southern History. Louisiana State University Press, 1979.
Volo, James M., Dorothy Denneen Volo. Encyclopedia of the antebellum South. Greenwood Press, 2000. .
Wilson, Charles Reagen, James G. Thomas, Ann J. Abadie, University of Mississippi. The new encyclopedia of Southern culture. University of North Carolina Press, 2006–2007. .

South America
Balderston, Daniel, Mike Gonzalez, Ana M. López. Encyclopedia of contemporary Latin American and Caribbean cultures. Routledge, 2000. .
Collier, Simon, Thomas E. Skidmore, Harold Blakemore. The Cambridge encyclopedia of Latin America and the Caribbean. Cambridge University Press, 1992. .
Gunson, Phil, Andrew Thompson, Greg Chamberlain. The dictionary of contemporary politics of South America. Routledge, 1989. .
Hallewell, Laurence. Historical dictionaries of Latin America. Scarecrow, 1967–. .
Kinsbruner, Jay, Erick Detlef Langer. Encyclopedia of Latin American history and culture. Gale, 2008. .
Sader, Emir. Latinoamericana: Enciclopedia contemporanea da America Latina e do Caribe. Laboratorio de Politicas Publicas; Boitempo Editorial, [2006?]. .
Smith, Joseph. Historical dictionary of United States–Latin American relations. Scarecrow Press, 2007. .
Tenenbaum, Barbara A. Latin America, history and culture: An encyclopedia for students. Macmillan Library Reference, 1999. .

Argentina
Chávez, Fermín, Roberto Vilchez, Enrique Manson, Lorenzo González. Diccionario histórico argentino. Ediciones Fabro, 2005. .
de Santillan, Diego Abad. Gran enciclopedia argentina. Ediar, 1956–1964.
Ezquerra, Jaime Alvar. Diccionario Espasa historia de España y América. Espasa, 2002. .
Kohut, David R., Olga Vilella, Beatric Julian. Historical dictionary of the "dirty wars". Scarecrow Press, 2003. .

Bolivia
Barnadas, Josep M., Guillermo Calvo, Juan Ticlla Grupo de Estudios Históricos. Diccionario histórico de Bolivia. Grupo de Estudios Históricos, 2002. .
Ezquerra, Jaime Alvar. Diccionario Espasa historia de España y América. Espasa, 2002. .
Sagárnaga M., J. Antonio. Breve diccionario de la cultura nativa en Bolivia. Producciones Cima, [2002].

Brazil
Brasil A/Z: Enciclopédia alfabética em um único volume. Editora Universo, 1988. .
de Oliveira, José Teixeira and Affonso d'Escragnolle Taunay. Dicionário brasileiro de datas históricas. Editora Vozes, 2002. .
Ezquerra, Jaime Alvar. Diccionario Espasa historia de España y América. Espasa, 2002. .
Flores, Moacyr. Dicionário de história do Brasil. EDIPUCRS, 2004. .
Lopes, Nei. Enciclopédia brasileira da diáspora africana. Selo Negro Edições, 2004. .
Vainfas, Renaldo. Dicionário do Brasil colonial, 1500–1808. Objetiva, 2000. .
Vainfas, Renaldo. Dicionário do Brasil imperial, 1822–1889. Objetiva, 2002. .

Chile
Céspedes, Mario, & Lelia Garreaud. Gran diccionario de Chile: Biográfico-cultural. Importadora Alfa, 1988.
Ezquerra, Jaime Alvar. Diccionario Espasa historia de España y América. Espasa, 2002. .
Kohut, David R., Olga Vilella, Beatric Julian. Historical dictionary of the "dirty wars". Scarecrow Press, 2003. .
Vergara, Abraham Quezada. Diccionario de conceptos históricos y geográficos de Chile. RIL Editores, 2004. .

Rapa Nui
West, Barbara A. Encyclopedia of the peoples of Asia and Oceania. Facts On File, 2009. .

Colombia
Ezquerra, Jaime Alvar. Diccionario Espasa historia de España y América. Espasa, 2002. .
Medellín, Jorge Alejandro, & Diana Fajardo Rivera. Diccionario de Colombia. Grupo Editorial Norma, 2005. .
Melo, Jorge Orlando, José Antonio Ocampo. Gran enciclopedia de Colombia: Temática. Círculo de Lectores, c1991–c1994. .

Ecuador
Albuja, Ana Maria Cadena. Este es mi país Ecuador: Enciclopedia temática-alfabética. Grupo Cultural, 2006. .
Ezquerra, Jaime Alvar. Diccionario Espasa historia de España y América. Espasa, 2002. .
Neto, Paulo de Carvalho. Diccionario del folklore ecuatoriano. Editorial Casa de la Cultura Ecuatoriana, 2001. .
Noboa, Fernando Jurado. Diccionario histórico genealógico de apellidos y familias de origen quechua, aymara y araucano (Ecuador). Temístocles Hernández, 2002. .
Ponce, Javier. Enciclopedia Ecuador a su alcance. Espasa, 2004. .

Falkland Islands
Gascoigne, Bamber. Encyclopedia of Britain. Macmillan, 1993. .

French Guiana
Corzani, Jack. Dictionnaire encyclopedique Desormeaux. Editions Desormeuax, [1992–1993]. .
Sellier, Jean, Anne. Le Fur, Bertrand de Brun. Atlas historique des provinces et régions de France: Genèse d'un peuple. La Découverte, 1997. .

Guyana
Balkaran, Lal. Dictionary of the Guyanese Amerindians and other South American native terms: An A–Z guide to their anthropology, cosmology, culture, exploration, history, geography, legend, folklore and myth. LBA, 2002. .
Gascoigne, Bamber. Encyclopedia of Britain. Macmillan, 1993. .
National History & Arts Council. Dictionary of Guyanese folklore. National History & Arts Council, 1975.

Paraguay
Ezquerra, Jaime Alvar. Diccionario Espasa historia de España y América. Espasa, 2002. .

Peru
Brown, Fortunato. Todo el Perú 1996: Breve enciclopedia peruana. Ediciones Brown, 1996. .
Enciclopedia tematica del Peru. El Comerio, 2004. .
Ezquerra, Jaime Alvar. Diccionario Espasa historia de España y América. Espasa, 2002. .

Suriname
Friedrich, Conrad, Albert Bruijning, Jan Voorhoeve, M. Gordijn. Encyclopedie van Suriname. Elsevier, 1977. .

Uruguay
Ezquerra, Jaime Alvar. Diccionario Espasa historia de España y América. Espasa, 2002. .
Kohut, David R., Olga Vilella, Beatric Julian. Historical dictionary of the "dirty wars". Scarecrow Press, 2003. .

Venezuela
Campos, Manuel Rodriguez, Sara Colmenares. Diccionario de historia de Venezuela. Fundacion Polar, 1997. .
Ezquerra, Jaime Alvar. Diccionario Espasa historia de España y América. Espasa, 2002. .
Gran enciclopedia de Venezuela. Globe, c1998–c2001. .
Sanz, Rodolfo. Diccionario para uso de chavistas, chavólogos y antichavistas. Editorial Nuevo Pensamiento Crítico, 2004. .
Strauss, Rafael A., Nelson Garrido. Diccionario de cultura popular. Fundación Bigott, [1999]. .

Antarctica
Gascoigne, Bamber. Encyclopedia of Britain. Macmillan, 1993. .
Mills, William J. Exploring polar frontiers: A historical encyclopedia. ABC-CLIO, 2003. .
Riffenburgh, Beau. Encyclopedia of the Antarctic. Routledge, 2007. .

South Georgia and the South Sandwich Islands
Gascoigne, Bamber. Encyclopedia of Britain. Macmillan, 1993. .

Asia
Embree, Ainslie Thomas, Asia Society. Encyclopedia of Asian history. Scribner; Collier Macmillan, 1988. . 
Ghazanfar, Shaikh M. Islamic civilization: History, contributions, and influence: A compendium of literature. Scarecrow Press, 2006. .
Shavit, David. United States in Asia: A Historical Dictionary. Greenwood, 1990.
West, Barbara A. Encyclopedia of the peoples of Asia and Oceania. Facts On File, 2009. .

Central Asia
Buell, Paul D. Historical dictionary of the Mongol world empire. Scarecrow Press, 2003. .
Dani, Ahmad Hasan, V. M. Masson, UNESCO. History of civilizations of Central Asia. UNESCO, 1992–.
East Asian Curriculum Project, Columbia University. The Mongols in world history. East Asian Curriculum Project. Available online here.
Embree, Ainslie Thomas, Asia Society. Encyclopedia of Asian history. Scribner; Collier Macmillan, 1988. .
Levinson, David Karen Christensen. Encyclopedia of modern Asia. Charles Scribner's Sons, 2002. .
Rhyne, George N., Edward J. Lazzerini, Bruce Friend Adams. The supplement to the modern encyclopedia of Russian, Soviet and Eurasian history. Academic International Press, 1995–. .
Somel, Selçuk Akşin. Historical dictionary of the Ottoman Empire. Scarecrow Press, 2003. .

Kazakhstan
Hanks, Reuel R. Central Asia: A global studies handbook. ABC-CLIO, 2005. .

Kyrgyzstan
Abazov, Rafis. Historical dictionary of Kyrgyzstan. Scarecrow Press, 2004. .
Hanks, Reuel R. Central Asia: A global studies handbook. ABC-CLIO, 2005. .

Tajikistan
Abdullaev, Kamoludin, Shahram Akbarzadeh. Historical dictionary of Tajikistan. Scarecrow Press, 2002. .

Turkmenistan
Abazov, Rafis. Historical dictionary of Turkmenistan. Scarecrow Press, 2005. .

Uzbekistan
Coughlin, Kathryn M. Muslim cultures today: A reference guide. Greenwood Press, 2006. .
Hanks, Reuel R. Central Asia: A global studies handbook. ABC-CLIO, 2005. .

East Asia
Levinson, David Karen Christensen. Encyclopedia of modern Asia. Charles Scribner's Sons, 2002. .
Matray, James Irving. East Asia and the United States: An encyclopedia of relations since 1784. Greenwood Press, 2002. .

China
Buell, Paul D. Historical dictionary of the Mongol world empire. Scarecrow Press, 2003. .
Cheng, Linsun, Kerry Brown. Berkshire encyclopedia of China: Modern and historic views of the world's newest and oldest global power. Berkshire, 2009. .
Darvis, Edward Lawrence. Encyclopedia of contemporary Chinese culture. Routledge, 2005. .
East Asian Curriculum Project, Columbia University. The Mongols in world history. East Asian Curriculum Project. Available online here.
Gao, James Zheng. Historical dictionary of modern China (1800-1949). Scarecrow Press, 2009. .
Guo, Jian, Yongyi Song, Yuan Zhou. Historical dictionary of the Chinese Cultural Revolution. Scarecrow Press, 2006. .
Historical Dictionary of Revolutionary China, 1839-1976, Greenwood, 1992.
James, C. V., Chung-kuo she hui kʻo hsüeh yüan; Chung-kuo she hui kʻo hsüeh chʻu pan she. Information China: The comprehensive and authoritative reference source of new China. Pergamon Press, 1989. .
LaFleur, Robert André. China: A global studies handbook. ABC-CLIO, 2003. .
Leese, Daniel. Brill's encyclopedia of China. Brill, 2009. .
Leung, Pak-Wah. Historical dictionary of revolutionary China, 1839–1976. Greenwood Press, 1992. .
Lieberthal, Kenneth, Bruce J. Dickson. A research guide to central party and government meetings in China, 1949–1986. M.E. Sharpe, 1989. .
Lin, Chun, Hans Hendrischke. The territories of the People's Republic of China. Routledge, 2006. .
Luo, Jing, Aimin Chen, Shunfeng Song. China today: An encyclopedia of life in the People's Republic. Greenwood Press, 2005. .
Michaud, Jean. Historical dictionary of the peoples of the Southeast Asian massif. Scarecrow Press, 2006. .
Olson, James Stuart. An ethnohistorical dictionary of China. Greenwood Press, 1998. .
O'Neill, Hugh. Companion to Chinese History. Facts on File, 1987.
Pong, David. Encyclopedia of modern China. Charles Scribner's Sons/Gale, Cengage Learning, c2009. .
Sullivan, Lawrence R. Historical dictionary of the People's Republic of China. Scarecrow Press, 2007. .
Sullivan, Lawrence R., Nancy R. Hearst. Historical dictionary of the People's Republic of China, 1949–1997. Scarecrow Press, 1997. .
Sutter, Robert G. Historical dictionary of Chinese foreign policy. Scarecrow Press, 2011. .
Tiedemann, R. G. Reference guide to Christian missionary societies in China: From the sixteenth to the twentieth century. M.E. Sharpe, 2009. .
Wang, Ke-Wen. Modern China: An encyclopedia of history, culture, and nationalism. Garland Publishing, 1998. .
Wortzel, Larry M., Robin D. S. Higham. Dictionary of contemporary Chinese military history. Greenwood Press, 1999. .
Xiong, Victor Cunrui. Historical dictionary of medieval China. Scarecrow Press, 2009. .

Hong Kong
Chan, Ming K., Shiu-Hing Lo. Historical dictionary of the Hong Kong SAR and the Macao SAR. Scarecrow Press, 2006. .
Roberts, Elfed Vaughan, Ngai-Ling Sum, Peter Bradshaw. Historical dictionary of Hong Kong and Macau. Scarecrow Press, 1992. .
Sutter, Robert G. Historical dictionary of Chinese foreign policy. Scarecrow Press, 2011. .

Macau
Chan, Ming K., Shiu-Hing Lo. Historical dictionary of the Hong Kong SAR and the Macao SAR. Scarecrow Press, 2006. .
Roberts, Elfed Vaughan, Ngai-Ling Sum, Peter Bradshaw. Historical dictionary of Hong Kong and Macau. Scarecrow Press, 1992. .

Japan
Bowring, Richard John, Peter F. Kornicki. The Cambridge encyclopedia of Japan. Cambridge University Press, 1993. .
Ellington, Lucien. Japan: A global studies handbook. ABC CLIO, 2002. .
Embree, Ainslie Thomas, Asia Society. Encyclopedia of Asian history. Scribner; Collier Macmillan, 1988. .
Hoover, William D. Historical dictionary of postwar Japan. Scarecrow Press, 2011. .
Huffman, James L. Modern Japan: An encyclopedia of history, culture, and nationalism. Garland Publishing, 1998.
Hunter, Janet. Concise Dictionary of Modern Japanese History. University of California Press, 1984.
Kodansha Encyclopedia of Japan. Kodansha, 2002. Available online here .
Kokushi Daijiten Henshū Iinkai. Kokushi Daijiten. Yoshikawa Kobunkan, 1979-1997. (v.1).
Perez, Louis G. Japan at war: an encyclopedia. ABC-CLIO, 2013. .
Stockwin, J. A. A. Dictionary of the modern politics of Japan. Routledge Curzon, 2003. .
Van Sant, John E., Peter Mauch, Yoneyuki Sugita. Historical dictionary of United States–Japan relations. Scarecrow Press, 2007. .

North Korea
Connor, Mary E. The Koreas: A global studies handbook. ABC-CLIO, 2002. .
Embree, Ainslie Thomas, Asia Society. Encyclopedia of Asian history. Scribner; Collier Macmillan, 1988. .
Kim, Ilpyong J. Historical dictionary of North Korea. Scarecrow Press, 2003. .
Pratt, Keith L., Richard Rutt, James Hoare. Korea: A historical and cultural dictionary. Curzon Press, 1999. ;  (pbk.)
Yŏnhap Tʻongsin. North Korea handbook. M.E. Sharpe, 2002. .

Korean War
Lentz, Robert J. Korean War filmography: 91 English language features through 2000. McFarland, 2003. .
Matray, James. Historical Dictionary of the Korean War. Greenwood, 1991. 
Summers, Harry G. Korean War Almanac. Facts on File, 1990.
Spencer Tucker, Paul G. Pierpaoli, Jinwung Kim, Xiaobing Li, James Irving Matray. The encyclopedia of the Korean War: A political, social, and military history. ABC-CLIO, 2010. .

South Korea
Connor, Mary E. The Koreas: A global studies handbook. ABC-CLIO, 2002. .
Embree, Ainslie Thomas, Asia Society. Encyclopedia of Asian history. Scribner; Collier Macmillan, 1988. .
Nahm, Andrew C., James Hoare. Historical dictionary of the Republic of Korea. Scarecrow Press, 2004.
Pratt, Keith L., Richard Rutt, James Hoare. Korea: A historical and cultural dictionary. Curzon Press, 1999. ;  (pbk.)

Korean War
Lentz, Robert J. Korean War filmography: 91 English language features through 2000. McFarland, 2003. .
Matray, James. Historical Dictionary of the Korean War. Greenwood, 1991. 
Summers, Harry G. Korean War Almanac. Facts on File, 1990.
Spencer Tucker, Paul G. Pierpaoli, Jinwung Kim, Xiaobing Li, James Irving Matray. The encyclopedia of the Korean War: A political, social, and military history. ABC-CLIO, 2010. .

Mongolia
Atwood, Christopher Pratt. Encyclopedia of Mongolia and the Mongol empire. Facts On File, 2004. .
Sanders, Alan J. K. Historical dictionary of Mongolia. Scarecrow Press, 2010. .

Taiwan
Cooper, John Franklin. Historical dictionary of Taiwan (Republic of China). Scarecrow Press, 2007. .
Lin, Chun, Hans Hendrischke. The territories of the People's Republic of China. Routledge, 2006. .
Olson, James Stuart. An ethnohistorical dictionary of China. Greenwood Press, 1998. .
Sutter, Robert G. Historical dictionary of Chinese foreign policy. Scarecrow Press, 2011. .

Middle East
Buell, Paul D. Historical dictionary of the Mongol world empire. Scarecrow Press, 2003. .
East Asian Curriculum Project, Columbia University. The Mongols in world history. East Asian Curriculum Project. Available online here.
Hahn, Peter L. Historical dictionary of United States–Middle East relations. Scarecrow Press, 2007. .
Hiro, Dilip. The essential Middle East: A comprehensive guide. Carroll & Graf, 2003. .
International encyclopaedia for the Middle Ages (IEMA): A supplement to LexMA-online. Brepols. Available online here.
Lexikon des Mittelalters online (LexMA). Brepols. Available online here. (German).
Mattar, Philip. Encyclopedia of the modern Middle East and North Africa. Macmillan Reference USA, 2004. .
Shavit, David. United States in Asia: A Historical Dictionary. Greenwood, 1990. .
Talhami, Ghada Hashem. Historical dictionary of women in the Middle East and North Africa. Scarecrow Press, 2013. .

Byzantium
Kazhdan, Alexander B. The Oxford Dictionary of Byzantium. Oxford University Press, 1991. .

Russia
A. I. Podberezkin Dukhovnoe nasledie. Rossiia—2000: Sovremennaia politicheskaia istoriia (1985–1999 gody). Vserossiiskoe obshchestvenno-politicheskoe dvizhenie v podderzhku otechestvennoi nauki, kultury, obrazovaniia, zdravookhraneniia i predprinimatel'stva "Dukhovnoe nasledie": RAU-Korporatsiia, 2000. .
Bienkowski, Piotr, A. R. Millard. Dictionary of the ancient Near East. University of Pennsylvania Press, 2000. .
Blackwell Encyclopedia of the Russian Revolution. Blackwell, 1988.
Coughlin, Kathryn M. Muslim cultures today: A reference guide. Greenwood Press, 2006. .
Hayes, Derek. Historical atlas of the Arctic. Douglas and McIntyre; University of Washington Press, 2003. .
Holland, Clive. Arctic exploration and development, c. 500 B.C. to 1915: An encyclopedia. Garland Publ., 1994. .
Jackson, George D., Robert James Devlin. Dictionary of the Russian Revolution. Greenwood Press, 1989. .
Langer, Lawrence N. Historical dictionary of medieval Russia. Scarecrow Press, 2002. .
Mills, William J. Exploring polar frontiers: A historical encyclopedia. ABC-CLIO, 2003. .
Nuttall, Mark. Encyclopedia of the Arctic. Routledge, 2005. .
Paxton, John. Encyclopedia of Russian History: From the Christianization of Kiev to the Breakup of the USSR. ABC-Clio, 1993.
Rhyne, George N., Edward J. Lazzerini, Bruce Friend Adams. The supplement to the modern encyclopedia of Russian, Soviet and Eurasian history. Academic International Press, 1995–. .
Shmidt, S. O., M. I. Andreev, V. M. Karev. Moskva: Entsiklopediia. Bol'shaia Rossiiskaia entsiklopediia, 1998. .

Soviet Union
Sovet Narodnykh Komissarov SSSR, Sovet Ministrov SSSR, Kabinet Ministrov SSSR, 1923–1991: Entsiklopedicheskii spravochnik. Izd-vo obʺedineniia "Mosgorarkhiv", 1999. .

South Asia
Embree, Ainslie Thomas, Asia Society. Encyclopedia of Asian history. Scribner; Collier Macmillan, 1988. .
Levinson, David Karen Christensen. Encyclopedia of modern Asia. Charles Scribner's Sons, 2002. .

Afghanistan
Adamec, Ludwig W. Historical dictionary of Afghan wars, revolutions, and insurgencies. Scarecrow Press, 2005. .
Adamec, Ludwig W. Historical dictionary of Afghanistan. Scarecrow Press, 2003. .
Clements, Frank A. Conflict in Afghanistan: A historical encyclopedia. ABC-CLIO, 2003. .
Coughlin, Kathryn M. Muslim cultures today: A reference guide. Greenwood Press, 2006. .

Bangladesh
Gascoigne, Bamber. Encyclopedia of Britain. Macmillan, 1993. .
Rahman, Syedur, Craig Baxter. Historical dictionary of Bangladesh. Scarecrow Press, 2010. .
Wolpert, Stanley A. Encyclopedia of India. Charles Scribner's Sons, Thomson Gale, 2006. .

Bhutan

British Indian Ocean Territory
Gascoigne, Bamber. Encyclopedia of Britain. Macmillan, 1993. .

India
Battacherje, S. B. Encyclopaedia of Indian events and dates. New Dawn Press, 2006. .
Bhattacharyya, Narendra Nath. The Geographical dictionary: Ancient and early medieval India. Munshiram Manoharlal Publishers, 1991. .
Blackwell, Frita. India: A global studies handbook. ABC-CLIO, 2004. .
Coughlin, Kathryn M. Muslim cultures today: A reference guide. Greenwood Press, 2006. .
Gascoigne, Bamber. Encyclopedia of Britain. Macmillan, 1993. .
Ghosh, A. An Encyclopedia of Indian Archaeology. Munshiram Manoharlal, 1989.
Kapoor, Subodh. The Indian encyclopaedia: Biographical, historical, religious, administrative, ethnological, commercial and scientific. Cosmo Publications, 2002. .
Khan, Iqtidar Alam. Historical dictionary of medieval India. Scarecrow Press, 2008. .
Mansighn, Surjit. Historical dictionary of India. Scarecrow Press, 2006. .
Mehra, Parshotam. Dictionary of Modern Indian History, 1707-1947. Oxford University Press, 1985.
Olson, James Stuart. An ethnohistorical dictionary of China. Greenwood Press, 1998. .
Roy, Kumkum. Historical dictionary of ancient India. Scarecrow Press, 2009. .
Wolpert, Stanley A. Encyclopedia of India. Charles Scribner's Sons, Thomson Gale, 2006. .

Maldives
Gascoigne, Bamber. Encyclopedia of Britain. Macmillan, 1993. .

Nepal
Shrestha, Nanda R., Keshav Bhattarai. Historical dictionary of Nepal. Oxford: Scarecrow Press, 2003. .
Wolpert, Stanley A. Encyclopedia of India. Charles Scribner's Sons, Thomson Gale, 2006. .

Pakistan
Burki, Shahid Javed. Historical dictionary of Pakistan. Scarecrow Press, 2006. .
Coughlin, Kathryn M. Muslim cultures today: A reference guide. Greenwood Press, 2006. .
Gascoigne, Bamber. Encyclopedia of Britain. Macmillan, 1993. .
Wolpert, Stanley A. Encyclopedia of India. Charles Scribner's Sons, Thomson Gale, 2006. .

Sri Lanka
Gascoigne, Bamber. Encyclopedia of Britain. Macmillan, 1993. .
Gunawardena, C. A. Encyclopedia of Sri Lanka. New Dawn Press, 2006. .
Samarasinghe, S. W. R. de A., Vidyamali Samarasinghe. Historical dictionary of Sri Lanka. Scarecrow Press, 1998. .
Wolpert, Stanley A. Encyclopedia of India. Charles Scribner's Sons, Thomson Gale, 2006. .

Southeast Asia
Dalby, Andrew. South East Asia: A guide to reference material. Hans Zell Publishers, 1993. .
Embree, Ainslie Thomas, Asia Society. Encyclopedia of Asian history. Scribner; Collier Macmillan, 1988. .
Levinson, David Karen Christensen. Encyclopedia of modern Asia. Charles Scribner's Sons, 2002. .
Miksic, John N. Historical dictionary of ancient Southeast Asia. Scarecrow Press, 2007. .
Oni, Keat Gin. Southeast Asia: A historical encyclopedia, from Angkor Wat to East Timor. ABC-CLIO, 2004. .
Weatherbee, Donald E. Historical dictionary of United States–Southeast Asia relations. Scarecrow Press, 2008. .

Brunei
Gascoigne, Bamber. Encyclopedia of Britain. Macmillan, 1993. .
Sidhu, Jatswan S., Ranjit Singh. Historical dictionary of Brunei Darussalam. Scarecrow Press, 2010. .

Cambodia
Corfield, Justin J., Laura Summers. Historical dictionary of Cambodia. Scarecrow Press, 2003. .
Michaud, Jean. Historical dictionary of the peoples of the Southeast Asian massif. Scarecrow Press, 2006. .

East Timor
Gunn, Geoffrey C. Historical dictionary of East Timor. Scarecrow Press, 2011. .

Indonesia
Coughlin, Kathryn M. Muslim cultures today: A reference guide. Greenwood Press, 2006. .
Cribb, R. B. Historical dictionary of Indonesia. Scarecrow Press, 1992. .
Lamoureux, Florence. Indonesia: A global studies handbook. ABC-CLIO, 2003. .
Post, Peter, William H. Frederick, Iris Heidebrink, Shigeru Satō, William Bradley Horton, Didi Kwartanada, Nederlands Instituut voor Oorlogsdocumentatie. The encyclopedia of Indonesia in the Pacific War. Brill, 2010. .

Laos
Michaud, Jean. Historical dictionary of the peoples of the Southeast Asian massif. Scarecrow Press, 2006. .
Stuart-Fox, Martin. Historical dictionary of Laos. Scarecrow Press, 2008. .

Malaysia
Gascoigne, Bamber. Encyclopedia of Britain. Macmillan, 1993. .
Ooi, Keat Gin. Historical dictionary of Malaysia. Scarecrow Press, 2009. .

Myanmar
Michaud, Jean. Historical dictionary of the peoples of the Southeast Asian massif. Scarecrow Press, 2006. .
Seekins, Donald M. Historical dictionary of Burma (Myanmar). Scarecrow Press, 2006. .

Philippines
Guillermo, Artemio R., May Kyi Win. Historical dictionary of the Philippines. Scarecrow Press, 2005. .
Senate of the Philippines. Senate of the Philippines. Available online here.
Tucker, Spencer D., James Arnold, Roberta Wiener, Paul G. Pierpaoli, Jack McCallum, Justin D. Murphy. The encyclopedia of the Spanish-American and Philippine-American wars: A political, social, and military history. ABC-CLIO, 2009. .
Woods, Damon L. The Philippines: A global studies handbook. ABC-CLIO, 2006. .

Singapore
Corfield, Justin J., Robin Corfield. Encyclopedia of Singapore. Scarecrow Press, 2006. .
Corfield, Justin J., K. Mulliner. Historical dictionary of Singapore. Scarecrow Press, 2011. .
Gascoigne, Bamber. Encyclopedia of Britain. Macmillan, 1993. .

Thailand
Michaud, Jean. Historical dictionary of the peoples of the Southeast Asian massif. Scarecrow Press, 2006. .
Smith, Harold E., Gayla S. Nieminen, May Kyi Win. Historical dictionary of Thailand. Scarecrow Press, 2005. .

Vietnam
Lockhart, Bruce McFarland, William J. Duiker. Historical dictionary of Vietnam. Scarecrow Press, 2006. .
Michaud, Jean. Historical dictionary of the peoples of the Southeast Asian massif. Scarecrow Press, 2006. .
Woods, L. Shelton. Vietnam: A global studies handbook. ABC-CLIO, 2002. .

Vietnam War
Anderson, David L. The Columbia guide to the Vietnam War. Columbia University Press, 2002. .
Frankum, Ronald Bruce. Historical dictionary of the war in Vietnam. Scarecrow Press, 2011. .
Kutler, Stanley. Encyclopedia of the Vietnam War. Simon & Schuster, 1994.
Olson, James S. Dictionary of the Vietnam War. Greenwood, 1988. 
Summers, Harry. Vietnam War Almanac. Facts on File, 1985.
Tucker, Spencer C, Paul G. Pierpaoli, Jr., Merle L. Pribbenow II, James H. Willbanks, David T. Zabecki. The encyclopedia of the Vietnam War: A political, social, and military history. ABC-CLIO, 2011. .

Western Asia
Clements, Frank. Historical dictionary of Arab and Islamic organizations. Scarecrow Press, 2001. .
Dumper, Michael, Bruce E. Stanley, Janet L. Abu-Lughod. Cities of the Middle East and North Africa: A historical encyclopedia. ABC-CLIO, 2007. .
ETANA: Electronic tools and ancient Near Eastern archives. Available online here.
Kumaraswamy, P. R. Historical dictionary of the Arab-Israeli conflict. Scarecrow Press, 2006. .
Mawṣililī, Ahmad. Historical dictionary of Islamic fundamentalist movements in the Arab world, Iran, and Turkey. Scarecrow Press, 1999. .
Meyers, Eric M., American Schools of Oriental Research. The Oxford encyclopedia of archaeology in the Near East. Oxford University Press, 1997. .
Somel, Selçuk Akşin. Historical dictionary of the Ottoman Empire. Scarecrow Press, 2003. .
Who's who in the Arab world. Publitec Editions, 1966–. .

Armenia
Adalian, Rouben Paul. Historical dictionary of Armenia. Scarecrow Press, 2002. .
Bienkowski, Piotr, A. R. Millard. Dictionary of the ancient Near East. University of Pennsylvania Press, 2000. .

Bahrain
Bienkowski, Piotr, A. R. Millard. Dictionary of the ancient Near East. University of Pennsylvania Press, 2000. .
Peck, Malcolm C. Historical dictionary of the Gulf Arab states. Scarecrow Press, 2007. .

Iran
Bienkowski, Piotr, A. R. Millard. Dictionary of the ancient Near East. University of Pennsylvania Press, 2000. .
Coughlin, Kathryn M. Muslim cultures today: A reference guide. Greenwood Press, 2006. .
Embree, Ainslie Thomas, Asia Society. Encyclopedia of Asian history. Scribner; Collier Macmillan, 1988. .
Gunter, Michael M. Historical dictionary of the Kurds. Scarecrow Press, 2004. .
Leick, Gwendolyn. Historical dictionary of Mesopotamia. Scarecrow Press, 2003. .
Lorentz, John H. Historical dictionary of Iran. Scarecrow Press, 2007. .
Mawṣililī, Ahmad. Historical dictionary of Islamic fundamentalist movements in the Arab world, Iran, and Turkey. Scarecrow Press, 1999. .
Yar-Shater, Ehsan. Encyclopaedia Iranica. Columbia University Center for Iranian Studies, 2002. Available online here.

Iraq
Bienkowski, Piotr, A. R. Millard. Dictionary of the ancient Near East. University of Pennsylvania Press, 2000. .
Coughlin, Kathryn M. Muslim cultures today: A reference guide. Greenwood Press, 2006. .
Ghareeb, Edmund, Beth Dougherty. Historical dictionary of Iraq. Scarecrow Press, 2004. .
Gunter, Michael M. Historical dictionary of the Kurds. Scarecrow Press, 2004. .
Leick, Gwendolyn. Historical dictionary of Mesopotamia. Scarecrow Press, 2003. .

Israel
Bienkowski, Piotr, A. R. Millard. Dictionary of the ancient Near East. University of Pennsylvania Press, 2000. .
Edelheit, Hershel, Abraham J. Edelheit. History of Zionism: A handbook and dictionary. Westview, [2000]. .
Kumaraswamy, P. R. Historical dictionary of the Arab-Israeli conflict. Scarecrow Press, 2006. .
Medoff, Rafael, Chaim Isaac Waxman. Historical dictionary of Zionism. Scarecrow Press, 2000. .
Reich, Bernard. Historical Dictionary of Israel. Scarecrow Press, 1992.
Reich, Bernard, David Howard Goldberg, Historical dictionary of Israel. Scarecrow Press, 2008. .
Wigoder, Geoffrey. New encyclopedia of Zionism and Israel. Fairleigh Dickinson University Press; Associated University Presses, 1994. .

Jordan
Bienkowski, Piotr, A. R. Millard. Dictionary of the ancient Near East. University of Pennsylvania Press, 2000. .

Kuwait
Bienkowski, Piotr, A. R. Millard. Dictionary of the ancient Near East. University of Pennsylvania Press, 2000. .
Leick, Gwendolyn. Historical dictionary of Mesopotamia. Scarecrow Press, 2003. .
Peck, Malcolm C. Historical dictionary of the Gulf Arab states. Scarecrow Press, 2007. .

Lebanon
AbuKhalil, Asʻad. Historical dictionary of Lebanon. Scarecrow Press, 1998. .
Bienkowski, Piotr, A. R. Millard. Dictionary of the ancient Near East. University of Pennsylvania Press, 2000. .

Oman
Bienkowski, Piotr, A. R. Millard. Dictionary of the ancient Near East. University of Pennsylvania Press, 2000. .
Peck, Malcolm C. Historical dictionary of the Gulf Arab states. Scarecrow Press, 2007. .

Palestine
Bienkowski, Piotr, A. R. Millard. Dictionary of the ancient Near East. University of Pennsylvania Press, 2000. .
Kumaraswamy, P. R. Historical dictionary of the Arab-Israeli conflict. Scarecrow Press, 2006. .
Mattar, Philip. Encyclopedia of the Palestinians. Facts on File, 2005. .
Nazzal, Nafez, Laila A. Nazzal. Historical dictionary of Palestine. Scarecrow Press, 1997. .

Qatar
Bienkowski, Piotr, A. R. Millard. Dictionary of the ancient Near East. University of Pennsylvania Press, 2000. .
Peck, Malcolm C. Historical dictionary of the Gulf Arab states. Scarecrow Press, 2007. .

Saudi Arabia
Bienkowski, Piotr, A. R. Millard. Dictionary of the ancient Near East. University of Pennsylvania Press, 2000. .
Coughlin, Kathryn M. Muslim cultures today: A reference guide. Greenwood Press, 2006. .
Peterson, John. Historical dictionary of Saudi Arabia. Scarecrow Press, 2003. .

Syria
Bienkowski, Piotr, A. R. Millard. Dictionary of the ancient Near East. University of Pennsylvania Press, 2000. .
Commins, David Dean. Historical dictionary of Syria. Scarecrow Press, 2004. .
Gunter, Michael M. Historical dictionary of the Kurds. Scarecrow Press, 2004. .
Leick, Gwendolyn. Historical dictionary of Mesopotamia. Scarecrow Press, 2003. .

United Arab Emirates
Bienkowski, Piotr, A. R. Millard. Dictionary of the ancient Near East. University of Pennsylvania Press, 2000. .
Peck, Malcolm C. Historical dictionary of the Gulf Arab states. Scarecrow Press, 2007. .

Yemen
Bienkowski, Piotr, A. R. Millard. Dictionary of the ancient Near East. University of Pennsylvania Press, 2000. .
Burrowes, Robert D. Historical dictionary of Yemen. Scarecrow Press, 1995. .

Atlantic Ocean

Saint Helena, Ascension, and Tristan da Cunha
Gascoigne, Bamber. Encyclopedia of Britain. Macmillan, 1993. .

Europe
Cook, Chris, Philip Broadhead. The Routledge companion to early modern Europe, 1453–1763. Routledge, 2006. .
International encyclopaedia for the Middle Ages (IEMA): A supplement to LexMA-online. Brepols. Available online here.
Koch, John T., Antone Minard. The Celts: history, life, and culture. ABC-CLIO, 2012. .
Lexikon des Mittelalters online (LexMA). Brepols. Available online here. (German).
Merriman, John M., J. M. Winter. Europe since 1914: Encyclopedia of the age of war and reconstruction. Charles Scribner's Sons/Thomson Gale, 2006. .
Olsen, James S. Historical Dictionary of European Imperialism. Greenwood, 1991. 
Roy, Joacquin, Aimee Kanner. Historical dictionary of the European Union. Scarecrow Press, 2006. .
Spector, Shmuel, Geoffrey Wigoder. The encyclopedia of Jewish life before and during the Holocaust. Yad Vashem; New York University Press, 2001. .

Central Europe
Webb, Adrian. The longman companion to Central and Eastern Europe since 1919. Longman, 2002. .

Austria

Croatia

Czech Republic

Germany

Jeep, John M. Medieval Germany: An encyclopedia. Garland, 2001. .
Sandford, John. Encyclopedia of contemporary German culture. Routledge, 1999. .

Hungary

Italy
Coppa, Frank J. Dictionary of modern Italian history. Greenwood Press, 1985. .

Liechtenstein
Jeep, John M. Medieval Germany: An encyclopedia. Garland, 2001. .

Poland

Romania

Slovakia

Slovenia

Switzerland
Jeep, John M. Medieval Germany: An encyclopedia. Garland, 2001. .
Sandford, John. Encyclopedia of contemporary German culture. Routledge, 1999. .
Schelbert, Leo. Historical dictionary of Switzerland. Scarecrow Press, 2007. .

Eastern Europe
Spector, Shmuel, Geoffrey Wigoder. The encyclopedia of Jewish life before and during the Holocaust. Yad Vashem; New York University Press, 2001. .
Webb, Adrian. The longman companion to Central and Eastern Europe since 1919. Longman, 2002. .

Armenia

Austria

Azerbaijan
Bienkowski, Piotr, A. R. Millard. Dictionary of the ancient Near East. University of Pennsylvania Press, 2000. .
Swietochowski, Tadeusz, Brian C. Collins. Historical dictionary of Azerbaijan. Scarecrow Press, 1999. .

Baltic states

Estonia
Miljan, Toivo. Historical dictionary of Estonia. Scarecrow Press, 2004. .

Latvia

Lithuania

Belarus

Croatia
Frucht, Richard C. Encyclopedia of Eastern Europe: From the Congress of Vienna to the fall of communism. Garland Publishing, 2000. .
Roman, Eric. Austria-Hungary and the successor states: A reference guide from the Renaissance to the present. Facts On File, 2003. .
Šuster, Željan. Historical dictionary of the Federal Republic of Yugoslavia. Scarecrow Press, 1999. .

Czech Republic
Frucht, Richard C. Encyclopedia of Eastern Europe: From the Congress of Vienna to the fall of communism. Garland Publishing, 2000. .
Hochman, Jiri. Historical dictionary of the Czech State. Scarecrow Press, 1998. .
Roman, Eric. Austria-Hungary and the successor states: A reference guide from the Renaissance to the present. Facts On File, 2003. .

Georgia
Bienkowski, Piotr, A. R. Millard. Dictionary of the ancient Near East. University of Pennsylvania Press, 2000. .
Mikaberidze, Alexander. Historical dictionary of Georgia. Scarecrow Press, 2007. .

Hungary
Frucht, Richard C. Encyclopedia of Eastern Europe: From the Congress of Vienna to the fall of communism. Garland Publishing, 2000. .
Roman, Eric. Austria-Hungary and the successor states: A reference guide from the Renaissance to the present. Facts On File, 2003. .

Kazakhstan

Moldova

Poland
Dzieęgielewski, Jan. Encyklopedia historii Polski: Dzieje polityczne. Morex: Egross, 1994–1995. .
Frucht, Richard C. Encyclopedia of Eastern Europe: From the Congress of Vienna to the fall of communism. Garland Publishing, 2000. .
Gorzdecka-Sanford, Adriana. Historical dictionary of Warsaw. Scarecrow Press, 1997. .

Romania
Frucht, Richard C. Encyclopedia of Eastern Europe: From the Congress of Vienna to the fall of communism. Garland Publishing, 2000. .

Russia
Blackwell Encyclopedia of the Russian Revolution. Blackwell, 1988.
Jackson, George & Robert Devlin. Dictionary of the Russian Revolution. Greenwood, 1989.
Paxton, John. Encyclopedia of Russian History: From the Christianization of Kiev to the Breakup of the USSR. ABC-Clio, 1993.

Slovakia
Frucht, Richard C. Encyclopedia of Eastern Europe: From the Congress of Vienna to the fall of communism. Garland Publishing, 2000. .
Roman, Eric. Austria-Hungary and the successor states: A reference guide from the Renaissance to the present. Facts On File, 2003. .

Slovenia
Frucht, Richard C. Encyclopedia of Eastern Europe: From the Congress of Vienna to the fall of communism. Garland Publishing, 2000. .
Roman, Eric. Austria-Hungary and the successor states: A reference guide from the Renaissance to the present. Facts On File, 2003. .
Šuster, Željan. Historical dictionary of the Federal Republic of Yugoslavia. Scarecrow Press, 1999. .

Southeast Europe
Somel, Selçuk Akşin. Historical dictionary of the Ottoman Empire. Scarecrow Press, 2003. .

Albania
Coughlin, Kathryn M. Muslim cultures today: A reference guide. Greenwood Press, 2006. .
Frucht, Richard C. Encyclopedia of Eastern Europe: From the Congress of Vienna to the fall of communism. Garland Publishing, 2000. .

Bosnia and Herzegovina
Coughlin, Kathryn M. Muslim cultures today: A reference guide. Greenwood Press, 2006. .
Frucht, Richard C. Encyclopedia of Eastern Europe: From the Congress of Vienna to the fall of communism. Garland Publishing, 2000. .
Roman, Eric. Austria-Hungary and the successor states: A reference guide from the Renaissance to the present. Facts On File, 2003. .
Šuster, Željan. Historical dictionary of the Federal Republic of Yugoslavia. Scarecrow Press, 1999. .

Bulgaria
Detrez, Raymond. Historical dictionary of Bulgaria. Scarecrow Press, 2006. .
Kumanov, Milen, Kolinka Isova. Istoricheska entsiklopediia Bulgariia. Trud, 2003. .
Frucht, Richard C. Encyclopedia of Eastern Europe: From the Congress of Vienna to the fall of communism. Garland Publishing, 2000. .

Cyprus
Gascoigne, Bamber. Encyclopedia of Britain. Macmillan, 1993. .

Greece

Macedonia
Frucht, Richard C. Encyclopedia of Eastern Europe: From the Congress of Vienna to the fall of communism. Garland Publishing, 2000. .
Kiselinovski, Stojan, Institut za nacionalna istorija (Skopje, Macedonia). Makedonski istoriski recnik. Institut za nacionalna istorija, 2000. .
Roman, Eric. Austria-Hungary and the successor states: A reference guide from the Renaissance to the present. Facts On File, 2003. .
Šuster, Željan. Historical dictionary of the Federal Republic of Yugoslavia. Scarecrow Press, 1999. .

Montenegro
Frucht, Richard C. Encyclopedia of Eastern Europe: From the Congress of Vienna to the fall of communism. Garland Publishing, 2000. .
Roman, Eric. Austria-Hungary and the successor states: A reference guide from the Renaissance to the present. Facts On File, 2003. .
Šuster, Željan. Historical dictionary of the Federal Republic of Yugoslavia. Scarecrow Press, 1999. .

Romania

Serbia
Frucht, Richard C. Encyclopedia of Eastern Europe: From the Congress of Vienna to the fall of communism. Garland Publishing, 2000. .
Roman, Eric. Austria-Hungary and the successor states: A reference guide from the Renaissance to the present. Facts On File, 2003. .
Šuster, Željan. Historical dictionary of the Federal Republic of Yugoslavia. Scarecrow Press, 1999. .

Turkey
Bienkowski, Piotr, A. R. Millard. Dictionary of the ancient Near East. University of Pennsylvania Press, 2000. .
Coughlin, Kathryn M. Muslim cultures today: A reference guide. Greenwood Press, 2006. .
Gunter, Michael M. Historical dictionary of the Kurds. Scarecrow Press, 2004. .
Heper, Metin. Historical dictionary of Turkey. Scarecrow Press, 2002. .
Leick, Gwendolyn. Historical dictionary of Mesopotamia. Scarecrow Press, 2003. .
Mawṣililī, Ahmad. Historical dictionary of Islamic fundamentalist movements in the Arab world, Iran, and Turkey. Scarecrow Press, 1999. .
Sauer, Jutta. Türkisches biographisches archiv (TBA). K. G. Saur, 1999–2002. .

Ukraine

Northern Europe

Aland Islands

Baltic states

Estonia

Latvia

Lithuania

Faroe Islands

Finland
Alho, Olli, Hildi Hawkins, Päivi Vallisaari Suomalaisen Kirjallisuuden Seura. Finland, a cultural encyclopedia. Finnish Literature Society, 1997. .
Hayes, Derek. Historical atlas of the Arctic. Douglas and McIntyre; University of Washington Press, 2003. .
Holland, Clive. Arctic exploration and development, c. 500 B.C. to 1915: An encyclopedia. Garland Publ., 1994. .
Mills, William J. Exploring polar frontiers: A historical encyclopedia. ABC-CLIO, 2003. .
Nuttall, Mark. Encyclopedia of the Arctic. Routledge, 2005. .
Pulsiano, Phillip, Kirsten Wolf, Paul Acker. Medieval Scandinavia: An encyclopedia. Garland, 1993. .

Iceland
Hálfdanarson, Guðmundur. Historical dictionary of Iceland. Scarecrow Press, 1997. .
Hayes, Derek. Historical atlas of the Arctic. Douglas and McIntyre; University of Washington Press, 2003. .
Holland, Clive. Arctic exploration and development, c. 500 B.C. to 1915: An encyclopedia. Garland Publ., 1994. .
Mills, William J. Exploring polar frontiers: A historical encyclopedia. ABC-CLIO, 2003. .
Nuttall, Mark. Encyclopedia of the Arctic. Routledge, 2005. .
Pulsiano, Phillip, Kirsten Wolf, Paul Acker. Medieval Scandinavia: An encyclopedia. Garland, 1993. .

Ireland
Ciment, James, Thaddeus Russell. The home front encyclopedia: United States, Britain, and Canada in World Wars I and II. ABC-CLIO, 2007. .
Donnelly, James S., Jr., Karl S. Bottigheimer. Encyclopedia of Irish history and culture. Macmillan Reference USA, 2004. .
Haigh, Christopher. The Cambridge Historical Encyclopedia of Great Britain and Ireland. Cambridge University Press, 1985.
Jenkins, Ellen J. Eighteenth-Century British Historians. Thomson Gale, 2007. .
Lalor, Brian, Frank McCourt. The encyclopedia of Ireland. Yale University Press, 2003. .

Isle of Man

Scandinavia
Nordstrom, Byron J. Dictionary of Scandinavian History. Greenwood, 1986.
Pulsiano, Phillip, Kirsten Wolf, Paul Acker. Medieval Scandinavia: An encyclopedia. Garland, 1993. .

Denmark
Pulsiano, Phillip, Kirsten Wolf, Paul Acker. Medieval Scandinavia: An encyclopedia. Garland, 1993. .

Norway
Hayes, Derek. Historical atlas of the Arctic. Douglas and McIntyre; University of Washington Press, 2003. .
Holland, Clive. Arctic exploration and development, c. 500 B.C. to 1915: An encyclopedia. Garland Publ., 1994. .
Mills, William J. Exploring polar frontiers: A historical encyclopedia. ABC-CLIO, 2003. .
Nuttall, Mark. Encyclopedia of the Arctic. Routledge, 2005. .
Pulsiano, Phillip, Kirsten Wolf, Paul Acker. Medieval Scandinavia: An encyclopedia. Garland, 1993. .
Sjåvik, Jan. Historical dictionary of Norway. Scarecrow Press, 2008. .

Sweden
Hayes, Derek. Historical atlas of the Arctic. Douglas and McIntyre; University of Washington Press, 2003. .
Holland, Clive. Arctic exploration and development, c. 500 B.C. to 1915: An encyclopedia. Garland Publ., 1994. .
Mills, William J. Exploring polar frontiers: A historical encyclopedia. ABC-CLIO, 2003. .
Nuttall, Mark. Encyclopedia of the Arctic. Routledge, 2005. .
Pulsiano, Phillip, Kirsten Wolf, Paul Acker. Medieval Scandinavia: An encyclopedia. Garland, 1993. .
Scobbie, Irene. Historical dictionary of Sweden. Scarecrow Press, 2006. .

United Kingdom
Alexander, Marc. A companion to the royal heritage of Britain. Sutton, 2005. ; .
Cannon, John Ashton. The Oxford companion to British history. Oxford University Press, 2002.
Ciment, James, Thaddeus Russell. The home front encyclopedia: United States, Britain, and Canada in World Wars I and II. ABC-CLIO, 2007. .
Cook, Chris. The Routledge companion to Britain in the nineteenth century, 1815–1914. Routledge, 2005. .
Cook, Chris, John Stevenson. The Longman companion to Britain since 1945. Longman, 2000. .
Dabydeen, David, John Gilmore, Cecily Jones. The Oxford companion to Black British history. Oxford University Press, 2007. .
Gascoigne, Bamber. Encyclopedia of Britain. Macmillan, 1993. .
Haigh, Christopher. The Cambridge Historical Encyclopedia of Great Britain and Ireland. Cambridge University Press, 1985.
Jenkins, Ellen J. Eighteenth-Century British Historians. Thomson Gale, 2007. .
Newman, Gerald, Leslie Ellen Brown. Britain in the Hanoverian age, 1714–1837: An encyclopedia. Garland Publishing, 1997. .
Richardson, John, Brian Christmas. The local historian's encyclopedia. Historical Publications, 2003. .
Wagner, J. A. Encyclopedia of the Wars of the Roses. ABC-CLIO, 2001. .

England
Fritze, Ronald H., William B. Robison. Historical dictionary of late medieval England, 1272–1485. Greenwood Press, c2002. .
Griffiths, Dennis. The encyclopedia of the British press, 1422–1992. St. Martin's Press, 1992. .
Kinney, Arthur F., David W. Swain, Eugene D. Hill. Tudor England: An encyclopedia. Garland, 2001.
Ollard, S. L., Gordon Crosse, Maurice Francis Bond. A dictionary of English church history. A.R. Mowbray; Morehouse-Gorham, [1948].
Watts, V. E., John Insley, Margaret Gelling. The Cambridge dictionary of English place-names: Based on the collections of the English Place-Name Society. Cambridge University Press, 2004. .

Northern Ireland
Donnelly, James S., Jr., Karl S. Bottigheimer. Encyclopedia of Irish history and culture. Macmillan Reference USA, 2004. .
Lalor, Brian, Frank McCourt. The encyclopedia of Ireland. Yale University Press, 2003. .

Scotland
Donnachie, Ian, George Hewitt. Collins dictionary of Scottish history. HarperCollins, 2001. .
Mullay, Sandy. The Edinburgh Encyclopedia. Mainstream, 1996.

Southern Europe

Southcentral Europe

Italy
Cancik, Hubert, Helmuth Schneider, Christine F. Salazar, David E. Orton. Brill's New Pauly: Encyclopaedia of the ancient world. Brill, 2002–. .
Dall'Acqua, Marzio. Enciclopedia di Parma: Dalle origini ai giorni nostri. F.M. Ricci, 1998. .
Grant, Michael and Rachel Kitzinger. Civilization of the Ancient Mediterranean: Greece and Rome. Scribner's, 1988. 
Historical Dictionary of Fascist Italy. Greenwood, 1982.
Nash, Ernest, Deutsches Archäologisches Institut. Pictorial dictionary of ancient Rome. Thames and Hudson, 1968.
Oxford Classical Dictionary. Oxford University Press, 1970.
Sandys, John Edwin. A companion to Latin studies. University Press, 1929 [1921].
Sarti, Roland. Italy: A reference guide from the Renaissance to the present. Facts On File, 2004. .
Secchia, Pietro, Enzo Nizza. Enciclopedia dell'antifascismo e della Resistenza. La Pietra [Walk Over], 1968–1989.
Speake, Graham. Encyclopedia of Greece and the Hellenic tradition. Fitzroy Dearborn, 2000.

San Marino

Vatican City

Southeastern Europe

Albania

Bosnia and Herzegovina

Bulgaria

Croatia

Cyprus
Bienkowski, Piotr, A. R. Millard. Dictionary of the ancient Near East. University of Pennsylvania Press, 2000. .
Gascoigne, Bamber. Encyclopedia of Britain. Macmillan, 1993. .
Panteli, Stavros. Historical dictionary of Cyprus. Scarecrow Press, 1994. .

Greece
Cancik, Hubert, Helmuth Schneider, Christine F. Salazar, David E. Orton. Brill's New Pauly: Encyclopaedia of the ancient world. Brill, 2002–. .
Grant, Michael and Rachel Kitzinger. Civilization of the Ancient Mediterranean: Greece and Rome. Scribner's, 1988. 
Hazel, John. Who's who in the Greek world. Routledge, 2000. .
Oxford Classical Dictionary. Oxford University Press, 1970.
Speake, Graham. Encyclopedia of Greece and the Hellenic tradition. Fitzroy Dearborn, 2000.
Traulos, Iōannēs N.,  Deutsches Archäologisches Institut. Pictorial dictionary of ancient Athens. Thames and Hudson, 1971. .
Whibley, Leonard. A companion to Greek studies. The University Press, 1931.

Kosovo
Frucht, Richard C. Encyclopedia of Eastern Europe: From the Congress of Vienna to the fall of communism. Garland Publishing, 2000. .
Roman, Eric. Austria-Hungary and the successor states: A reference guide from the Renaissance to the present. Facts On File, 2003. .
Šuster, Željan. Historical dictionary of the Federal Republic of Yugoslavia. Scarecrow Press, 1999. .

Macedonia

Malta
Berg, Warren G. Historical dictionary of Malta. Scarecrow Press, 1995. .
Gascoigne, Bamber. Encyclopedia of Britain. Macmillan, 1993. .

Montenegro

Romania

Serbia

Slovenia

Southwestern Europe
Gerli, E. Michael, Samuel G. Armistead. Medieval Iberia: An encyclopedia. Routledge, 2003. .

Andorra

Gibraltar
Gascoigne, Bamber. Encyclopedia of Britain. Macmillan, 1993. .

Portugal
Santana, Francisco, Eduardo Sucena. Dicionário da história de Lisboa. C. Quintas, 1994. .
Serrão, Joel. Dicionário de história de Portugal. Iniciativas Editoriais, [1975–].

Spain
Beede, Benjamin R. The War of 1898 and U.S. interventions, 1898–1934: An encyclopedia. Garland, 1994. .
Cortada, James W. Historical dictionary of the Spanish Civil War, 1936–1939. Greenwood Press, 1982. .
Historical Dictionary of Modern Spain, 1700-1988. Greenwood, 1990.
Historical Dictionary of the Spanish Empire, 1402-1975. Greenwood, 1991.
Rodgers, E. J., Valerie Rodgers. Encyclopedia of contemporary Spanish culture. Routledge, 1999. .
Tucker, Spencer D., James Arnold, Roberta Wiener, Paul G. Pierpaoli, Jack McCallum, Justin D. Murphy. The encyclopedia of the Spanish-American and Philippine-American wars: A political, social, and military history. ABC-CLIO, 2009. .

Western Europe

Austria
Austria from A to Z. Graz Technical University. Available online here.
Jeep, John M. Medieval Germany: An encyclopedia. Garland, 2001. .
Roman, Eric. Austria-Hungary and the successor states: A reference guide from the Renaissance to the present. Facts On File, 2003. .
Sandford, John. Encyclopedia of contemporary German culture. Routledge, 1999. .

Belgium
Jeep, John M. Medieval Germany: An encyclopedia. Garland, 2001. .
State, Paul F. Historical dictionary of Brussels. Scarecrow Press, 2004. .

France
Antony, Bernard. Dictionnaire de la réplique. Godefroy de Bouillon, [2004].
Fremont-Barnes, Gregory. The encyclopedia of the French revolutionary and Napoleonic Wars: A political, social, and military history. ABC-CLIO, 2006. ; .
Furet, François and Mona Ozouf. A Critical Dictionary of the French Revolution. Harvard University Press, 1989.
Historical Dictionary of France from the 1815 Restoration to the Second Empire. Greenwood, 1987.
Historical Dictionary of Napoleanic France, 1799-1815. Greenwood, 1985.
Historical Dictionary of the French Second Empire, 1852-1879. Greenwood, 1985.
Historical Dictionary of the Third French Republic, 1870-1940. Greenwood, 1986.
Historical Dictionary of the Fourth, Fifth and Sixth Republics, 1946-1991. Greenwood, 1992.
Jouanna, Arlette. Histoire et dictionnaire des guerres de religion. R. Laffont, 1998. .
Northcutt, Wayne. Historical dictionary of the French Fourth and Fifth Republics, 1946–1991. Greenwood Press, 1992. .
Paxton, John. Companion to the French Revolution. Facts on File, 1988.
Pope, Stephen. Dictionary of the Napoleonic wars. Facts on File, 1999. .
Roberts, William J. France: A reference guide from the Renaissance to the present. Facts On File, 2004. .
Scott, Samuel F. and Barry Rothaus. Historical Dictionary of the French Revolution 1789-1799. Greenwood, 1985. .
Sellier, Jean, Anne. Le Fur, Bertrand de Brun. Atlas historique des provinces et régions de France: Genèse d'un peuple. La Découverte, 1997. .
Sirinelli, Jean-François, Daniel Couty. Dictionnaire de l'histoire de France. A. Colin, 1999. .
Suratteau, Jean-René, Francis Gendron, Jean Paul Bertaud. Dictionnaire historique de la Révolution française. Presses universitaires de France, 1989. .

Germany
Epstein, Eric Joseph, Philip Rosen, Henry R. Huttenbach. Dictionary of the Holocaust: Biography, geography, and terminology. Greenwood Press, 1997. .
Gutman, Israel. Encyclopedia of the Holocaust. Macmillan, 1990. 
Jeep, John M. Medieval Germany: An encyclopedia. Garland, 2001. .
Sandford, John. Encyclopedia of contemporary German culture. Routledge, 1999. .
Taddey, Gerhard. Lexikon der deutschen Geschichte: Ereignisse, Institutionen, Personen: von den Anfängen bis zur Kapitulation 1945. Kröner, 1998. ; .
Vincent, C. Paul, Harry Ritter. A historical dictionary of Germany's Weimar Republic, 1918–1933. Greenwood Press, 1997. .
Zentner, Christian and Friedemann Bedurftig. Encyclopedia of the Third Reich. Macmillan, 1991.

Liechtenstein

Luxembourg
Barteau, Harry C. Historical dictionary of Luxembourg. Scarecrow Press, 1996. .

Monaco

Netherlands
Jeep, John M. Medieval Germany: An encyclopedia. Garland, 2001. .
Koopmans, Joop W., A. H. Huussen. Historical dictionary of the Netherlands. Scarecrow Press, 2007. .

Switzerland

Byzantium
Kazhdan, Alexander B. The Oxford Dictionary of Byzantium. Oxford University Press, 1991.

Oceania
Craig, Robert D., Frank P. King. Historical dictionary of Oceania. Greenwood Press, 1981. .
Lal, Brij V., Kate Fortune. The Pacific Islands: An encyclopedia. University of Hawai'i Press, 2000. .
West, Barbara A. Encyclopedia of the peoples of Asia and Oceania. Facts On File, 2009. .

Australia
The Australian encyclopaedia. Australian Geographic Society, 1996. .
Bassett, Jan. Oxford Dictionary of Australian History. Oxford University Press, 1986.
Docherty, James. Historical Dictionary of Australia. Scarecrow Press, 1993.
Gascoigne, Bamber. Encyclopedia of Britain. Macmillan, 1993. .
Gilbert, Alan D. Australians: A Historical Library. Cambridge University Press, 1988.

Melanesia

Fiji
Gascoigne, Bamber. Encyclopedia of Britain. Macmillan, 1993. .

New Caledonia
Sellier, Jean, Anne. Le Fur, Bertrand de Brun. Atlas historique des provinces et régions de France: Genèse d'un peuple. La Découverte, 1997. .

Papua New Guinea
Gascoigne, Bamber. Encyclopedia of Britain. Macmillan, 1993. .

Solomon Islands
Gascoigne, Bamber. Encyclopedia of Britain. Macmillan, 1993. .

Vanuatu
Gascoigne, Bamber. Encyclopedia of Britain. Macmillan, 1993. .

Micronesia
Wuerch, William L., Dirk Anthony Ballendorf. Historical dictionary of Guam and Micronesia. Scarecrow Press, 1994. .

Federated States of Micronesia

Guam
Wuerch, William L., Dirk Anthony Ballendorf. Historical dictionary of Guam and Micronesia. Scarecrow Press, 1994. .

Kiribati
Gascoigne, Bamber. Encyclopedia of Britain. Macmillan, 1993. .

Marshall islands

Nauru
Gascoigne, Bamber. Encyclopedia of Britain. Macmillan, 1993. .

Northern Mariana Islands

Palau

Polynesia
Craig, Robert D. Historical dictionary of Polynesia. Scarecrow Press, 2002. .
Historical Dictionary of Polynesia. Scarecrow Press, 2011. .

American Samoa

Cook Islands
Craig, Robert D. Historical dictionary of Polynesia. Scarecrow Press, 2002. .

Easter Island
Craig, Robert D. Historical dictionary of Polynesia. Scarecrow Press, 2002. .

French Polynesia
Craig, Robert D. Historical dictionary of Polynesia. Scarecrow Press, 2002. .
Sellier, Jean, Anne. Le Fur, Bertrand de Brun. Atlas historique des provinces et régions de France: Genèse d'un peuple. La Découverte, 1997. .

Tahiti
O'Reilly, Patrick, Raoul Teissier, J. Boullaire. Tahitiens: Répertoire biographique de la Polynésie française. Musée de l'homme, 1975. (French)

Hawaii
Craig, Robert D. Historical dictionary of Polynesia. Scarecrow Press, 2002. .

New Zealand
Bateman New Zealand encyclopedia. David Bateman Ltd., 2005. .
Craig, Robert D. Historical dictionary of Polynesia. Scarecrow Press, 2002. .
Gascoigne, Bamber. Encyclopedia of Britain. Macmillan, 1993. .
Te Ara--The Encyclopedia of New Zealand. Manatu Taonga Ministry for Culture and Heritage, 2005-. Available online here.

Niue
Craig, Robert D. Historical dictionary of Polynesia. Scarecrow Press, 2002. .

Norfolk Island

Pitcairn Islands
Craig, Robert D. Historical dictionary of Polynesia. Scarecrow Press, 2002. .
Gascoigne, Bamber. Encyclopedia of Britain. Macmillan, 1993. .

Samoa
Craig, Robert D. Historical dictionary of Polynesia. Scarecrow Press, 2002. .
Gascoigne, Bamber. Encyclopedia of Britain. Macmillan, 1993. .

Tokelau
Craig, Robert D. Historical dictionary of Polynesia. Scarecrow Press, 2002. .

Tonga
Craig, Robert D. Historical dictionary of Polynesia. Scarecrow Press, 2002. .
Gascoigne, Bamber. Encyclopedia of Britain. Macmillan, 1993. .

Tuvalu
Craig, Robert D. Historical dictionary of Polynesia. Scarecrow Press, 2002. .
Gascoigne, Bamber. Encyclopedia of Britain. Macmillan, 1993. .

Wallis and Futuna
Craig, Robert D. Historical dictionary of Polynesia. Scarecrow Press, 2002. .
Sellier, Jean, Anne. Le Fur, Bertrand de Brun. Atlas historique des provinces et régions de France: Genèse d'un peuple. La Découverte, 1997. .

Today in history
Denney, Robert E., Gregory J. W. Urwin. The Civil War years: A day-by-day chronicle of the life of a nation. Sterling, 1992. .
Gutierrez, Pedro Rafael. Calendario historico: 500 anos de historia de Costa Rica. Universidad Autonoma de Centro America, 1988. .
Johnson, David E. From day to day: A calendar of notable birthdays and events. Scarecrow Press, 2001. .
Marsh, W. B., Bruce Carrick. 365: Your date with history. Icon, 2004. .

See also 
 Bibliography of encyclopedias

Citations

References
Guide to Reference.  American Library Association. Retrieved 5 December 2014. (subscription required).
Kister, Kenneth F. (1994). Kister's Best Encyclopedias (2nd ed.). Phoenix: Oryx. .

Historians
History books